

401001–401100 

|-bgcolor=#fefefe
| 401001 ||  || — || January 31, 2006 || Kitt Peak || Spacewatch || — || align=right data-sort-value="0.75" | 750 m || 
|-id=002 bgcolor=#fefefe
| 401002 ||  || — || August 19, 2001 || Socorro || LINEAR || — || align=right data-sort-value="0.72" | 720 m || 
|-id=003 bgcolor=#fefefe
| 401003 ||  || — || September 10, 2004 || Kitt Peak || Spacewatch || — || align=right data-sort-value="0.73" | 730 m || 
|-id=004 bgcolor=#fefefe
| 401004 ||  || — || August 9, 2004 || Anderson Mesa || LONEOS || — || align=right data-sort-value="0.71" | 710 m || 
|-id=005 bgcolor=#fefefe
| 401005 ||  || — || February 14, 2010 || Mount Lemmon || Mount Lemmon Survey || — || align=right data-sort-value="0.63" | 630 m || 
|-id=006 bgcolor=#E9E9E9
| 401006 ||  || — || October 4, 2003 || Kitt Peak || Spacewatch || — || align=right | 3.3 km || 
|-id=007 bgcolor=#fefefe
| 401007 ||  || — || December 25, 2005 || Kitt Peak || Spacewatch || — || align=right data-sort-value="0.65" | 650 m || 
|-id=008 bgcolor=#fefefe
| 401008 ||  || — || November 29, 2005 || Kitt Peak || Spacewatch || — || align=right data-sort-value="0.84" | 840 m || 
|-id=009 bgcolor=#FA8072
| 401009 ||  || — || September 20, 2001 || Socorro || LINEAR || — || align=right data-sort-value="0.71" | 710 m || 
|-id=010 bgcolor=#fefefe
| 401010 ||  || — || November 17, 2001 || Socorro || LINEAR || — || align=right data-sort-value="0.64" | 640 m || 
|-id=011 bgcolor=#fefefe
| 401011 ||  || — || August 16, 2001 || Socorro || LINEAR || — || align=right data-sort-value="0.67" | 670 m || 
|-id=012 bgcolor=#fefefe
| 401012 ||  || — || September 20, 2001 || Socorro || LINEAR || — || align=right data-sort-value="0.61" | 610 m || 
|-id=013 bgcolor=#fefefe
| 401013 ||  || — || November 18, 2008 || Kitt Peak || Spacewatch || — || align=right data-sort-value="0.92" | 920 m || 
|-id=014 bgcolor=#fefefe
| 401014 ||  || — || June 16, 2010 || WISE || WISE || V || align=right | 2.6 km || 
|-id=015 bgcolor=#fefefe
| 401015 ||  || — || March 13, 2010 || Kitt Peak || Spacewatch || — || align=right data-sort-value="0.83" | 830 m || 
|-id=016 bgcolor=#fefefe
| 401016 ||  || — || December 30, 2008 || Mount Lemmon || Mount Lemmon Survey || — || align=right data-sort-value="0.88" | 880 m || 
|-id=017 bgcolor=#fefefe
| 401017 ||  || — || September 21, 2011 || Mount Lemmon || Mount Lemmon Survey || — || align=right data-sort-value="0.93" | 930 m || 
|-id=018 bgcolor=#fefefe
| 401018 ||  || — || October 23, 2004 || Kitt Peak || Spacewatch || — || align=right data-sort-value="0.98" | 980 m || 
|-id=019 bgcolor=#E9E9E9
| 401019 ||  || — || May 4, 2005 || Kitt Peak || Spacewatch || HOF || align=right | 2.3 km || 
|-id=020 bgcolor=#fefefe
| 401020 ||  || — || September 11, 2007 || Mount Lemmon || Mount Lemmon Survey || V || align=right data-sort-value="0.60" | 600 m || 
|-id=021 bgcolor=#fefefe
| 401021 ||  || — || September 8, 2011 || Kitt Peak || Spacewatch || V || align=right data-sort-value="0.69" | 690 m || 
|-id=022 bgcolor=#fefefe
| 401022 ||  || — || August 25, 2000 || Socorro || LINEAR || — || align=right data-sort-value="0.94" | 940 m || 
|-id=023 bgcolor=#FA8072
| 401023 ||  || — || December 31, 2008 || Kitt Peak || Spacewatch || — || align=right data-sort-value="0.67" | 670 m || 
|-id=024 bgcolor=#fefefe
| 401024 ||  || — || April 24, 2003 || Kitt Peak || Spacewatch || NYS || align=right data-sort-value="0.63" | 630 m || 
|-id=025 bgcolor=#fefefe
| 401025 ||  || — || February 2, 2006 || Mount Lemmon || Mount Lemmon Survey || V || align=right data-sort-value="0.66" | 660 m || 
|-id=026 bgcolor=#fefefe
| 401026 ||  || — || March 23, 2003 || Kitt Peak || Spacewatch || (2076) || align=right data-sort-value="0.71" | 710 m || 
|-id=027 bgcolor=#fefefe
| 401027 ||  || — || February 15, 2010 || Kitt Peak || Spacewatch || — || align=right data-sort-value="0.80" | 800 m || 
|-id=028 bgcolor=#fefefe
| 401028 ||  || — || May 12, 2010 || Mount Lemmon || Mount Lemmon Survey || — || align=right data-sort-value="0.90" | 900 m || 
|-id=029 bgcolor=#fefefe
| 401029 ||  || — || October 16, 2001 || Kitt Peak || Spacewatch || — || align=right data-sort-value="0.57" | 570 m || 
|-id=030 bgcolor=#fefefe
| 401030 ||  || — || October 26, 2008 || Mount Lemmon || Mount Lemmon Survey || — || align=right data-sort-value="0.68" | 680 m || 
|-id=031 bgcolor=#fefefe
| 401031 ||  || — || August 10, 2007 || Kitt Peak || Spacewatch || — || align=right data-sort-value="0.90" | 900 m || 
|-id=032 bgcolor=#fefefe
| 401032 ||  || — || February 14, 2010 || Mount Lemmon || Mount Lemmon Survey || — || align=right data-sort-value="0.78" | 780 m || 
|-id=033 bgcolor=#d6d6d6
| 401033 ||  || — || September 17, 2006 || Kitt Peak || Spacewatch || EOS || align=right | 2.3 km || 
|-id=034 bgcolor=#E9E9E9
| 401034 ||  || — || September 26, 2011 || Kitt Peak || Spacewatch || — || align=right | 1.5 km || 
|-id=035 bgcolor=#fefefe
| 401035 ||  || — || January 20, 2009 || Mount Lemmon || Mount Lemmon Survey || (2076) || align=right data-sort-value="0.77" | 770 m || 
|-id=036 bgcolor=#fefefe
| 401036 ||  || — || October 15, 2004 || Kitt Peak || Spacewatch || — || align=right data-sort-value="0.82" | 820 m || 
|-id=037 bgcolor=#fefefe
| 401037 ||  || — || January 30, 2006 || Kitt Peak || Spacewatch || — || align=right data-sort-value="0.75" | 750 m || 
|-id=038 bgcolor=#d6d6d6
| 401038 ||  || — || April 30, 2009 || Kitt Peak || Spacewatch || — || align=right | 3.0 km || 
|-id=039 bgcolor=#E9E9E9
| 401039 ||  || — || February 13, 2004 || Kitt Peak || Spacewatch || — || align=right | 1.5 km || 
|-id=040 bgcolor=#fefefe
| 401040 ||  || — || December 27, 2005 || Kitt Peak || Spacewatch || — || align=right data-sort-value="0.70" | 700 m || 
|-id=041 bgcolor=#fefefe
| 401041 ||  || — || October 15, 2004 || Mount Lemmon || Mount Lemmon Survey || V || align=right data-sort-value="0.68" | 680 m || 
|-id=042 bgcolor=#E9E9E9
| 401042 ||  || — || September 29, 2011 || Kitt Peak || Spacewatch || HOF || align=right | 2.8 km || 
|-id=043 bgcolor=#fefefe
| 401043 ||  || — || February 27, 2006 || Kitt Peak || Spacewatch || — || align=right data-sort-value="0.97" | 970 m || 
|-id=044 bgcolor=#fefefe
| 401044 ||  || — || December 18, 2001 || Socorro || LINEAR || — || align=right | 1.00 km || 
|-id=045 bgcolor=#fefefe
| 401045 ||  || — || December 31, 2008 || Kitt Peak || Spacewatch || — || align=right data-sort-value="0.76" | 760 m || 
|-id=046 bgcolor=#fefefe
| 401046 ||  || — || September 27, 2008 || Mount Lemmon || Mount Lemmon Survey || — || align=right data-sort-value="0.58" | 580 m || 
|-id=047 bgcolor=#fefefe
| 401047 ||  || — || September 28, 2011 || Catalina || CSS || — || align=right | 1.2 km || 
|-id=048 bgcolor=#E9E9E9
| 401048 || 2011 UK || — || February 9, 2005 || Mount Lemmon || Mount Lemmon Survey || — || align=right | 1.1 km || 
|-id=049 bgcolor=#fefefe
| 401049 ||  || — || June 20, 2007 || Kitt Peak || Spacewatch || — || align=right data-sort-value="0.86" | 860 m || 
|-id=050 bgcolor=#E9E9E9
| 401050 ||  || — || December 3, 2007 || Kitt Peak || Spacewatch || — || align=right | 1.9 km || 
|-id=051 bgcolor=#E9E9E9
| 401051 ||  || — || October 18, 2011 || Mount Lemmon || Mount Lemmon Survey || — || align=right | 1.5 km || 
|-id=052 bgcolor=#d6d6d6
| 401052 ||  || — || May 28, 2008 || Mount Lemmon || Mount Lemmon Survey || — || align=right | 3.4 km || 
|-id=053 bgcolor=#fefefe
| 401053 ||  || — || November 20, 2004 || Kitt Peak || Spacewatch || V || align=right data-sort-value="0.73" | 730 m || 
|-id=054 bgcolor=#E9E9E9
| 401054 ||  || — || March 16, 2009 || Kitt Peak || Spacewatch || — || align=right | 1.4 km || 
|-id=055 bgcolor=#d6d6d6
| 401055 ||  || — || October 19, 2011 || Kitt Peak || Spacewatch || — || align=right | 2.8 km || 
|-id=056 bgcolor=#fefefe
| 401056 ||  || — || September 10, 2007 || Mount Lemmon || Mount Lemmon Survey || NYS || align=right data-sort-value="0.64" | 640 m || 
|-id=057 bgcolor=#fefefe
| 401057 ||  || — || October 19, 2011 || Mount Lemmon || Mount Lemmon Survey || (2076) || align=right data-sort-value="0.91" | 910 m || 
|-id=058 bgcolor=#E9E9E9
| 401058 ||  || — || December 5, 2007 || Kitt Peak || Spacewatch || — || align=right | 1.6 km || 
|-id=059 bgcolor=#fefefe
| 401059 ||  || — || December 5, 2008 || Mount Lemmon || Mount Lemmon Survey || V || align=right data-sort-value="0.62" | 620 m || 
|-id=060 bgcolor=#d6d6d6
| 401060 ||  || — || March 26, 2009 || Mount Lemmon || Mount Lemmon Survey || Tj (2.92) || align=right | 4.5 km || 
|-id=061 bgcolor=#fefefe
| 401061 ||  || — || October 1, 2000 || Socorro || LINEAR || — || align=right data-sort-value="0.86" | 860 m || 
|-id=062 bgcolor=#E9E9E9
| 401062 ||  || — || August 24, 2007 || Kitt Peak || Spacewatch || EUN || align=right | 1.2 km || 
|-id=063 bgcolor=#fefefe
| 401063 ||  || — || November 19, 2001 || Socorro || LINEAR || — || align=right | 1.0 km || 
|-id=064 bgcolor=#E9E9E9
| 401064 ||  || — || October 18, 2011 || Kitt Peak || Spacewatch || — || align=right | 1.5 km || 
|-id=065 bgcolor=#fefefe
| 401065 ||  || — || May 31, 2006 || Mount Lemmon || Mount Lemmon Survey || — || align=right data-sort-value="0.83" | 830 m || 
|-id=066 bgcolor=#fefefe
| 401066 ||  || — || October 7, 2004 || Kitt Peak || Spacewatch || — || align=right data-sort-value="0.79" | 790 m || 
|-id=067 bgcolor=#d6d6d6
| 401067 ||  || — || May 21, 2010 || WISE || WISE || — || align=right | 4.0 km || 
|-id=068 bgcolor=#fefefe
| 401068 ||  || — || August 7, 2004 || Campo Imperatore || CINEOS || — || align=right data-sort-value="0.82" | 820 m || 
|-id=069 bgcolor=#E9E9E9
| 401069 ||  || — || September 18, 2007 || Mount Lemmon || Mount Lemmon Survey || EUN || align=right data-sort-value="0.96" | 960 m || 
|-id=070 bgcolor=#E9E9E9
| 401070 ||  || — || March 27, 2009 || Mount Lemmon || Mount Lemmon Survey || NEM || align=right | 2.3 km || 
|-id=071 bgcolor=#fefefe
| 401071 ||  || — || October 14, 2001 || Socorro || LINEAR || — || align=right data-sort-value="0.54" | 540 m || 
|-id=072 bgcolor=#fefefe
| 401072 ||  || — || October 4, 2004 || Kitt Peak || Spacewatch || V || align=right data-sort-value="0.56" | 560 m || 
|-id=073 bgcolor=#d6d6d6
| 401073 ||  || — || November 20, 2006 || Kitt Peak || Spacewatch || — || align=right | 3.2 km || 
|-id=074 bgcolor=#E9E9E9
| 401074 ||  || — || March 31, 2009 || Mount Lemmon || Mount Lemmon Survey || — || align=right | 1.1 km || 
|-id=075 bgcolor=#E9E9E9
| 401075 ||  || — || May 7, 2010 || Mount Lemmon || Mount Lemmon Survey || — || align=right | 1.4 km || 
|-id=076 bgcolor=#fefefe
| 401076 ||  || — || April 5, 2010 || Mount Lemmon || Mount Lemmon Survey || — || align=right data-sort-value="0.79" | 790 m || 
|-id=077 bgcolor=#E9E9E9
| 401077 ||  || — || April 19, 2010 || WISE || WISE || — || align=right | 2.9 km || 
|-id=078 bgcolor=#fefefe
| 401078 ||  || — || September 29, 2003 || Kitt Peak || Spacewatch || NYS || align=right data-sort-value="0.72" | 720 m || 
|-id=079 bgcolor=#E9E9E9
| 401079 ||  || — || May 27, 2010 || WISE || WISE || — || align=right | 3.0 km || 
|-id=080 bgcolor=#E9E9E9
| 401080 ||  || — || April 13, 2005 || Catalina || CSS || MAR || align=right | 1.1 km || 
|-id=081 bgcolor=#fefefe
| 401081 ||  || — || April 11, 2010 || Kitt Peak || Spacewatch || — || align=right data-sort-value="0.78" | 780 m || 
|-id=082 bgcolor=#fefefe
| 401082 ||  || — || March 19, 2010 || Kitt Peak || Spacewatch || — || align=right data-sort-value="0.84" | 840 m || 
|-id=083 bgcolor=#fefefe
| 401083 ||  || — || December 24, 2005 || Kitt Peak || Spacewatch || — || align=right data-sort-value="0.67" | 670 m || 
|-id=084 bgcolor=#fefefe
| 401084 ||  || — || November 11, 2004 || Kitt Peak || Spacewatch || — || align=right data-sort-value="0.97" | 970 m || 
|-id=085 bgcolor=#E9E9E9
| 401085 ||  || — || October 20, 2011 || Kitt Peak || Spacewatch || — || align=right | 2.2 km || 
|-id=086 bgcolor=#d6d6d6
| 401086 ||  || — || September 27, 2011 || Mount Lemmon || Mount Lemmon Survey || — || align=right | 3.9 km || 
|-id=087 bgcolor=#E9E9E9
| 401087 ||  || — || October 22, 2011 || Kitt Peak || Spacewatch || — || align=right | 2.2 km || 
|-id=088 bgcolor=#E9E9E9
| 401088 ||  || — || October 20, 2011 || Kitt Peak || Spacewatch || — || align=right | 1.6 km || 
|-id=089 bgcolor=#fefefe
| 401089 ||  || — || March 2, 2006 || Kitt Peak || Spacewatch || — || align=right data-sort-value="0.64" | 640 m || 
|-id=090 bgcolor=#fefefe
| 401090 ||  || — || January 30, 2006 || Kitt Peak || Spacewatch || — || align=right data-sort-value="0.89" | 890 m || 
|-id=091 bgcolor=#d6d6d6
| 401091 ||  || — || July 8, 2010 || WISE || WISE || EUP || align=right | 4.3 km || 
|-id=092 bgcolor=#E9E9E9
| 401092 ||  || — || October 24, 2011 || Mount Lemmon || Mount Lemmon Survey || — || align=right | 1.9 km || 
|-id=093 bgcolor=#E9E9E9
| 401093 ||  || — || October 8, 2007 || Mount Lemmon || Mount Lemmon Survey || — || align=right | 1.2 km || 
|-id=094 bgcolor=#fefefe
| 401094 ||  || — || January 25, 2006 || Kitt Peak || Spacewatch || — || align=right data-sort-value="0.73" | 730 m || 
|-id=095 bgcolor=#fefefe
| 401095 ||  || — || October 1, 2000 || Socorro || LINEAR || — || align=right data-sort-value="0.71" | 710 m || 
|-id=096 bgcolor=#E9E9E9
| 401096 ||  || — || December 13, 2007 || Socorro || LINEAR || — || align=right | 1.3 km || 
|-id=097 bgcolor=#fefefe
| 401097 ||  || — || December 3, 2004 || Kitt Peak || Spacewatch || — || align=right data-sort-value="0.75" | 750 m || 
|-id=098 bgcolor=#fefefe
| 401098 ||  || — || June 23, 2007 || Kitt Peak || Spacewatch || — || align=right data-sort-value="0.77" | 770 m || 
|-id=099 bgcolor=#FA8072
| 401099 ||  || — || April 19, 2007 || Mount Lemmon || Mount Lemmon Survey || — || align=right data-sort-value="0.63" | 630 m || 
|-id=100 bgcolor=#fefefe
| 401100 ||  || — || September 23, 2011 || Kitt Peak || Spacewatch || — || align=right data-sort-value="0.94" | 940 m || 
|}

401101–401200 

|-bgcolor=#fefefe
| 401101 ||  || — || October 21, 2011 || Kitt Peak || Spacewatch || — || align=right data-sort-value="0.95" | 950 m || 
|-id=102 bgcolor=#fefefe
| 401102 ||  || — || December 10, 2004 || Kitt Peak || Spacewatch || — || align=right data-sort-value="0.96" | 960 m || 
|-id=103 bgcolor=#E9E9E9
| 401103 ||  || — || October 9, 2007 || Kitt Peak || Spacewatch || — || align=right | 1.0 km || 
|-id=104 bgcolor=#fefefe
| 401104 ||  || — || September 18, 2007 || Kitt Peak || Spacewatch || — || align=right | 1.1 km || 
|-id=105 bgcolor=#E9E9E9
| 401105 ||  || — || April 15, 2010 || Mount Lemmon || Mount Lemmon Survey || — || align=right data-sort-value="0.90" | 900 m || 
|-id=106 bgcolor=#E9E9E9
| 401106 ||  || — || October 22, 2011 || Kitt Peak || Spacewatch || — || align=right | 2.8 km || 
|-id=107 bgcolor=#d6d6d6
| 401107 ||  || — || September 12, 2010 || Mount Lemmon || Mount Lemmon Survey || — || align=right | 2.7 km || 
|-id=108 bgcolor=#fefefe
| 401108 ||  || — || May 5, 2010 || Mount Lemmon || Mount Lemmon Survey || — || align=right data-sort-value="0.98" | 980 m || 
|-id=109 bgcolor=#fefefe
| 401109 ||  || — || February 9, 2005 || Mount Lemmon || Mount Lemmon Survey || MAS || align=right data-sort-value="0.65" | 650 m || 
|-id=110 bgcolor=#E9E9E9
| 401110 ||  || — || September 30, 2006 || Catalina || CSS || AGN || align=right | 1.4 km || 
|-id=111 bgcolor=#E9E9E9
| 401111 ||  || — || April 18, 2009 || Mount Lemmon || Mount Lemmon Survey || — || align=right | 1.9 km || 
|-id=112 bgcolor=#E9E9E9
| 401112 ||  || — || October 18, 2011 || Mount Lemmon || Mount Lemmon Survey || — || align=right | 1.8 km || 
|-id=113 bgcolor=#fefefe
| 401113 ||  || — || October 13, 2004 || Kitt Peak || Spacewatch || V || align=right data-sort-value="0.57" | 570 m || 
|-id=114 bgcolor=#E9E9E9
| 401114 ||  || — || November 18, 2003 || Kitt Peak || Spacewatch || — || align=right data-sort-value="0.92" | 920 m || 
|-id=115 bgcolor=#E9E9E9
| 401115 ||  || — || November 7, 2007 || Mount Lemmon || Mount Lemmon Survey || — || align=right | 2.7 km || 
|-id=116 bgcolor=#fefefe
| 401116 ||  || — || December 30, 2008 || Kitt Peak || Spacewatch || — || align=right data-sort-value="0.76" | 760 m || 
|-id=117 bgcolor=#d6d6d6
| 401117 ||  || — || October 23, 2011 || Kitt Peak || Spacewatch || — || align=right | 3.3 km || 
|-id=118 bgcolor=#E9E9E9
| 401118 ||  || — || December 16, 2007 || Kitt Peak || Spacewatch || — || align=right | 2.0 km || 
|-id=119 bgcolor=#fefefe
| 401119 ||  || — || September 5, 1999 || Kitt Peak || Spacewatch || — || align=right data-sort-value="0.93" | 930 m || 
|-id=120 bgcolor=#fefefe
| 401120 ||  || — || October 8, 2004 || Kitt Peak || Spacewatch || (2076) || align=right data-sort-value="0.74" | 740 m || 
|-id=121 bgcolor=#fefefe
| 401121 ||  || — || November 25, 2000 || Kitt Peak || Spacewatch || — || align=right data-sort-value="0.92" | 920 m || 
|-id=122 bgcolor=#E9E9E9
| 401122 ||  || — || October 28, 2011 || Kitt Peak || Spacewatch || (5) || align=right data-sort-value="0.87" | 870 m || 
|-id=123 bgcolor=#E9E9E9
| 401123 ||  || — || January 16, 2004 || Kitt Peak || Spacewatch || — || align=right | 1.4 km || 
|-id=124 bgcolor=#fefefe
| 401124 ||  || — || April 9, 2010 || Kitt Peak || Spacewatch || NYS || align=right data-sort-value="0.79" | 790 m || 
|-id=125 bgcolor=#fefefe
| 401125 ||  || — || December 3, 2004 || Kitt Peak || Spacewatch || — || align=right data-sort-value="0.86" | 860 m || 
|-id=126 bgcolor=#fefefe
| 401126 ||  || — || May 15, 2004 || Campo Imperatore || CINEOS || — || align=right data-sort-value="0.80" | 800 m || 
|-id=127 bgcolor=#d6d6d6
| 401127 ||  || — || October 6, 2005 || Kitt Peak || Spacewatch || — || align=right | 3.4 km || 
|-id=128 bgcolor=#fefefe
| 401128 ||  || — || October 2, 1997 || Caussols || ODAS || — || align=right data-sort-value="0.85" | 850 m || 
|-id=129 bgcolor=#d6d6d6
| 401129 ||  || — || November 20, 2000 || Socorro || LINEAR || — || align=right | 4.1 km || 
|-id=130 bgcolor=#fefefe
| 401130 ||  || — || December 30, 2008 || Mount Lemmon || Mount Lemmon Survey || — || align=right data-sort-value="0.89" | 890 m || 
|-id=131 bgcolor=#fefefe
| 401131 ||  || — || September 11, 2007 || Kitt Peak || Spacewatch || NYS || align=right data-sort-value="0.72" | 720 m || 
|-id=132 bgcolor=#fefefe
| 401132 ||  || — || April 7, 2010 || Kitt Peak || Spacewatch || — || align=right data-sort-value="0.73" | 730 m || 
|-id=133 bgcolor=#fefefe
| 401133 ||  || — || September 24, 2011 || Mount Lemmon || Mount Lemmon Survey || — || align=right data-sort-value="0.77" | 770 m || 
|-id=134 bgcolor=#E9E9E9
| 401134 ||  || — || September 23, 2006 || Kitt Peak || Spacewatch || — || align=right | 1.4 km || 
|-id=135 bgcolor=#fefefe
| 401135 ||  || — || November 11, 2004 || Kitt Peak || Spacewatch || — || align=right data-sort-value="0.71" | 710 m || 
|-id=136 bgcolor=#fefefe
| 401136 ||  || — || April 8, 2010 || Kitt Peak || Spacewatch || — || align=right data-sort-value="0.75" | 750 m || 
|-id=137 bgcolor=#E9E9E9
| 401137 ||  || — || May 17, 2005 || Mount Lemmon || Mount Lemmon Survey || MAR || align=right | 1.1 km || 
|-id=138 bgcolor=#fefefe
| 401138 ||  || — || May 5, 2003 || Anderson Mesa || LONEOS || — || align=right | 1.6 km || 
|-id=139 bgcolor=#fefefe
| 401139 ||  || — || October 7, 2004 || Kitt Peak || Spacewatch || — || align=right data-sort-value="0.73" | 730 m || 
|-id=140 bgcolor=#fefefe
| 401140 ||  || — || October 10, 2004 || Kitt Peak || Spacewatch || — || align=right | 1.0 km || 
|-id=141 bgcolor=#fefefe
| 401141 ||  || — || August 3, 1999 || Kitt Peak || Spacewatch || — || align=right data-sort-value="0.97" | 970 m || 
|-id=142 bgcolor=#E9E9E9
| 401142 ||  || — || September 26, 2006 || Catalina || CSS || GEF || align=right | 1.5 km || 
|-id=143 bgcolor=#E9E9E9
| 401143 ||  || — || June 21, 2010 || Mount Lemmon || Mount Lemmon Survey || — || align=right | 2.6 km || 
|-id=144 bgcolor=#fefefe
| 401144 ||  || — || August 22, 2007 || Anderson Mesa || LONEOS || MAS || align=right data-sort-value="0.86" | 860 m || 
|-id=145 bgcolor=#E9E9E9
| 401145 ||  || — || October 3, 2011 || XuYi || PMO NEO || — || align=right | 2.2 km || 
|-id=146 bgcolor=#FA8072
| 401146 ||  || — || September 27, 2000 || Socorro || LINEAR || — || align=right | 3.7 km || 
|-id=147 bgcolor=#fefefe
| 401147 ||  || — || March 20, 2010 || Kitt Peak || Spacewatch || MAS || align=right data-sort-value="0.78" | 780 m || 
|-id=148 bgcolor=#d6d6d6
| 401148 ||  || — || November 27, 2006 || Kitt Peak || Spacewatch || — || align=right | 2.8 km || 
|-id=149 bgcolor=#E9E9E9
| 401149 ||  || — || April 22, 2009 || Mount Lemmon || Mount Lemmon Survey || — || align=right | 3.3 km || 
|-id=150 bgcolor=#E9E9E9
| 401150 ||  || — || November 15, 1998 || Kitt Peak || Spacewatch || — || align=right | 2.4 km || 
|-id=151 bgcolor=#fefefe
| 401151 ||  || — || September 21, 2001 || Socorro || LINEAR || — || align=right data-sort-value="0.63" | 630 m || 
|-id=152 bgcolor=#fefefe
| 401152 ||  || — || September 23, 2011 || Kitt Peak || Spacewatch || (5026) || align=right data-sort-value="0.90" | 900 m || 
|-id=153 bgcolor=#E9E9E9
| 401153 ||  || — || July 26, 2006 || Siding Spring || SSS || — || align=right | 1.3 km || 
|-id=154 bgcolor=#E9E9E9
| 401154 ||  || — || September 17, 2006 || Catalina || CSS || HNS || align=right | 1.9 km || 
|-id=155 bgcolor=#E9E9E9
| 401155 ||  || — || April 2, 2005 || Mount Lemmon || Mount Lemmon Survey || — || align=right data-sort-value="0.88" | 880 m || 
|-id=156 bgcolor=#E9E9E9
| 401156 ||  || — || November 20, 2003 || Socorro || LINEAR || — || align=right | 1.1 km || 
|-id=157 bgcolor=#E9E9E9
| 401157 ||  || — || December 4, 2007 || Mount Lemmon || Mount Lemmon Survey || — || align=right | 2.1 km || 
|-id=158 bgcolor=#fefefe
| 401158 ||  || — || January 6, 2005 || Socorro || LINEAR || — || align=right | 1.0 km || 
|-id=159 bgcolor=#d6d6d6
| 401159 ||  || — || November 23, 2011 || Kitt Peak || Spacewatch || — || align=right | 3.7 km || 
|-id=160 bgcolor=#d6d6d6
| 401160 ||  || — || December 12, 2006 || Kitt Peak || Spacewatch || — || align=right | 3.5 km || 
|-id=161 bgcolor=#E9E9E9
| 401161 ||  || — || May 16, 2009 || Mount Lemmon || Mount Lemmon Survey || — || align=right | 2.2 km || 
|-id=162 bgcolor=#fefefe
| 401162 ||  || — || October 1, 2000 || Anderson Mesa || LONEOS || NYS || align=right data-sort-value="0.64" | 640 m || 
|-id=163 bgcolor=#d6d6d6
| 401163 ||  || — || March 1, 2008 || Kitt Peak || Spacewatch || EMA || align=right | 3.3 km || 
|-id=164 bgcolor=#fefefe
| 401164 ||  || — || April 8, 2010 || Kitt Peak || Spacewatch || — || align=right data-sort-value="0.99" | 990 m || 
|-id=165 bgcolor=#E9E9E9
| 401165 ||  || — || October 27, 2011 || Mount Lemmon || Mount Lemmon Survey || — || align=right | 1.9 km || 
|-id=166 bgcolor=#fefefe
| 401166 ||  || — || October 15, 2007 || Kitt Peak || Spacewatch || V || align=right data-sort-value="0.78" | 780 m || 
|-id=167 bgcolor=#E9E9E9
| 401167 ||  || — || October 10, 2007 || Mount Lemmon || Mount Lemmon Survey || — || align=right | 1.1 km || 
|-id=168 bgcolor=#fefefe
| 401168 ||  || — || October 21, 2011 || Mount Lemmon || Mount Lemmon Survey || — || align=right | 1.0 km || 
|-id=169 bgcolor=#E9E9E9
| 401169 ||  || — || December 15, 2007 || Mount Lemmon || Mount Lemmon Survey || — || align=right data-sort-value="0.96" | 960 m || 
|-id=170 bgcolor=#d6d6d6
| 401170 ||  || — || June 1, 2010 || WISE || WISE || — || align=right | 4.5 km || 
|-id=171 bgcolor=#d6d6d6
| 401171 ||  || — || December 9, 2006 || Kitt Peak || Spacewatch || — || align=right | 3.0 km || 
|-id=172 bgcolor=#d6d6d6
| 401172 ||  || — || September 25, 2005 || Kitt Peak || Spacewatch || — || align=right | 2.4 km || 
|-id=173 bgcolor=#fefefe
| 401173 ||  || — || October 23, 2004 || Kitt Peak || Spacewatch || — || align=right data-sort-value="0.66" | 660 m || 
|-id=174 bgcolor=#fefefe
| 401174 ||  || — || October 23, 2004 || Kitt Peak || Spacewatch || — || align=right data-sort-value="0.61" | 610 m || 
|-id=175 bgcolor=#E9E9E9
| 401175 ||  || — || February 9, 2008 || Catalina || CSS || — || align=right | 2.7 km || 
|-id=176 bgcolor=#E9E9E9
| 401176 ||  || — || April 21, 2009 || Mount Lemmon || Mount Lemmon Survey || KON || align=right | 2.3 km || 
|-id=177 bgcolor=#fefefe
| 401177 ||  || — || March 31, 2003 || Kitt Peak || Spacewatch || — || align=right data-sort-value="0.96" | 960 m || 
|-id=178 bgcolor=#E9E9E9
| 401178 ||  || — || October 20, 2006 || Kitt Peak || Spacewatch || — || align=right | 2.2 km || 
|-id=179 bgcolor=#E9E9E9
| 401179 ||  || — || May 10, 2005 || Kitt Peak || Spacewatch || — || align=right | 2.1 km || 
|-id=180 bgcolor=#d6d6d6
| 401180 ||  || — || December 17, 2001 || Socorro || LINEAR || — || align=right | 3.9 km || 
|-id=181 bgcolor=#E9E9E9
| 401181 ||  || — || May 4, 2010 || WISE || WISE || — || align=right | 2.1 km || 
|-id=182 bgcolor=#d6d6d6
| 401182 ||  || — || June 8, 2010 || WISE || WISE || — || align=right | 3.5 km || 
|-id=183 bgcolor=#d6d6d6
| 401183 ||  || — || November 1, 2006 || Mount Lemmon || Mount Lemmon Survey || — || align=right | 3.9 km || 
|-id=184 bgcolor=#d6d6d6
| 401184 ||  || — || April 15, 2008 || Mount Lemmon || Mount Lemmon Survey || — || align=right | 2.6 km || 
|-id=185 bgcolor=#d6d6d6
| 401185 ||  || — || October 11, 2005 || Kitt Peak || Spacewatch || — || align=right | 2.6 km || 
|-id=186 bgcolor=#fefefe
| 401186 ||  || — || September 30, 2003 || Kitt Peak || Spacewatch || — || align=right | 1.0 km || 
|-id=187 bgcolor=#E9E9E9
| 401187 ||  || — || November 8, 2007 || Mount Lemmon || Mount Lemmon Survey || — || align=right | 2.3 km || 
|-id=188 bgcolor=#fefefe
| 401188 ||  || — || January 31, 2009 || Kitt Peak || Spacewatch || — || align=right data-sort-value="0.80" | 800 m || 
|-id=189 bgcolor=#fefefe
| 401189 ||  || — || December 12, 2004 || Kitt Peak || Spacewatch || — || align=right data-sort-value="0.93" | 930 m || 
|-id=190 bgcolor=#fefefe
| 401190 ||  || — || December 10, 2004 || Socorro || LINEAR || — || align=right data-sort-value="0.99" | 990 m || 
|-id=191 bgcolor=#fefefe
| 401191 ||  || — || October 13, 2007 || Catalina || CSS || — || align=right data-sort-value="0.90" | 900 m || 
|-id=192 bgcolor=#fefefe
| 401192 ||  || — || June 23, 2007 || Kitt Peak || Spacewatch || — || align=right data-sort-value="0.75" | 750 m || 
|-id=193 bgcolor=#d6d6d6
| 401193 ||  || — || November 17, 2011 || Kitt Peak || Spacewatch || — || align=right | 2.3 km || 
|-id=194 bgcolor=#E9E9E9
| 401194 ||  || — || May 8, 2005 || Kitt Peak || Spacewatch || — || align=right data-sort-value="0.92" | 920 m || 
|-id=195 bgcolor=#E9E9E9
| 401195 ||  || — || November 1, 2011 || Mount Lemmon || Mount Lemmon Survey || EUN || align=right | 1.6 km || 
|-id=196 bgcolor=#E9E9E9
| 401196 ||  || — || October 27, 2006 || Catalina || CSS || GEF || align=right | 1.4 km || 
|-id=197 bgcolor=#E9E9E9
| 401197 ||  || — || October 18, 2011 || Kitt Peak || Spacewatch || — || align=right | 2.5 km || 
|-id=198 bgcolor=#fefefe
| 401198 ||  || — || February 4, 2005 || Kitt Peak || Spacewatch || V || align=right data-sort-value="0.78" | 780 m || 
|-id=199 bgcolor=#E9E9E9
| 401199 ||  || — || July 4, 2010 || Kitt Peak || Spacewatch || — || align=right | 1.9 km || 
|-id=200 bgcolor=#d6d6d6
| 401200 ||  || — || September 18, 2010 || Mount Lemmon || Mount Lemmon Survey || — || align=right | 3.7 km || 
|}

401201–401300 

|-bgcolor=#fefefe
| 401201 ||  || — || June 13, 2007 || Catalina || CSS || — || align=right | 1.5 km || 
|-id=202 bgcolor=#d6d6d6
| 401202 ||  || — || November 18, 2011 || Mount Lemmon || Mount Lemmon Survey || EOS || align=right | 2.2 km || 
|-id=203 bgcolor=#E9E9E9
| 401203 ||  || — || November 18, 2007 || Kitt Peak || Spacewatch || — || align=right | 1.2 km || 
|-id=204 bgcolor=#E9E9E9
| 401204 ||  || — || November 16, 2006 || Kitt Peak || Spacewatch || — || align=right | 2.0 km || 
|-id=205 bgcolor=#E9E9E9
| 401205 ||  || — || October 22, 2006 || Mount Lemmon || Mount Lemmon Survey || — || align=right | 2.5 km || 
|-id=206 bgcolor=#d6d6d6
| 401206 ||  || — || April 14, 2008 || Mount Lemmon || Mount Lemmon Survey || — || align=right | 3.2 km || 
|-id=207 bgcolor=#E9E9E9
| 401207 ||  || — || January 19, 2008 || Mount Lemmon || Mount Lemmon Survey || MAR || align=right | 1.1 km || 
|-id=208 bgcolor=#E9E9E9
| 401208 ||  || — || November 9, 2007 || Mount Lemmon || Mount Lemmon Survey || MAR || align=right | 1.3 km || 
|-id=209 bgcolor=#d6d6d6
| 401209 ||  || — || December 25, 2011 || Kitt Peak || Spacewatch || THB || align=right | 4.0 km || 
|-id=210 bgcolor=#d6d6d6
| 401210 ||  || — || December 26, 2011 || Kitt Peak || Spacewatch || — || align=right | 3.7 km || 
|-id=211 bgcolor=#E9E9E9
| 401211 ||  || — || August 27, 2006 || Kitt Peak || Spacewatch || — || align=right | 1.1 km || 
|-id=212 bgcolor=#d6d6d6
| 401212 ||  || — || April 28, 2008 || Mount Lemmon || Mount Lemmon Survey || — || align=right | 3.9 km || 
|-id=213 bgcolor=#E9E9E9
| 401213 ||  || — || January 12, 2008 || Kitt Peak || Spacewatch || — || align=right | 1.4 km || 
|-id=214 bgcolor=#d6d6d6
| 401214 ||  || — || July 2, 2010 || WISE || WISE || — || align=right | 4.9 km || 
|-id=215 bgcolor=#E9E9E9
| 401215 ||  || — || October 23, 2006 || Mount Lemmon || Mount Lemmon Survey || AGN || align=right | 1.2 km || 
|-id=216 bgcolor=#E9E9E9
| 401216 ||  || — || June 21, 2010 || WISE || WISE || — || align=right | 3.1 km || 
|-id=217 bgcolor=#d6d6d6
| 401217 ||  || — || February 16, 2007 || Catalina || CSS || — || align=right | 3.9 km || 
|-id=218 bgcolor=#fefefe
| 401218 ||  || — || December 5, 2007 || Kitt Peak || Spacewatch || — || align=right | 1.3 km || 
|-id=219 bgcolor=#E9E9E9
| 401219 ||  || — || April 27, 2009 || Kitt Peak || Spacewatch || — || align=right | 1.9 km || 
|-id=220 bgcolor=#d6d6d6
| 401220 ||  || — || December 13, 2006 || Mount Lemmon || Mount Lemmon Survey || — || align=right | 4.0 km || 
|-id=221 bgcolor=#d6d6d6
| 401221 ||  || — || November 12, 2010 || Mount Lemmon || Mount Lemmon Survey || — || align=right | 3.4 km || 
|-id=222 bgcolor=#E9E9E9
| 401222 ||  || — || April 13, 2005 || Catalina || CSS || — || align=right | 1.5 km || 
|-id=223 bgcolor=#d6d6d6
| 401223 ||  || — || May 15, 2008 || Mount Lemmon || Mount Lemmon Survey || — || align=right | 3.7 km || 
|-id=224 bgcolor=#E9E9E9
| 401224 ||  || — || June 26, 1997 || Kitt Peak || Spacewatch || — || align=right | 1.7 km || 
|-id=225 bgcolor=#E9E9E9
| 401225 ||  || — || August 29, 2006 || Anderson Mesa || LONEOS || — || align=right | 1.7 km || 
|-id=226 bgcolor=#fefefe
| 401226 ||  || — || October 7, 2004 || Socorro || LINEAR || — || align=right data-sort-value="0.87" | 870 m || 
|-id=227 bgcolor=#d6d6d6
| 401227 ||  || — || October 11, 2010 || Mount Lemmon || Mount Lemmon Survey || — || align=right | 3.2 km || 
|-id=228 bgcolor=#E9E9E9
| 401228 ||  || — || February 10, 1999 || Kitt Peak || Spacewatch || — || align=right | 1.8 km || 
|-id=229 bgcolor=#E9E9E9
| 401229 ||  || — || August 27, 2006 || Anderson Mesa || LONEOS || — || align=right | 1.2 km || 
|-id=230 bgcolor=#d6d6d6
| 401230 ||  || — || October 11, 2010 || Catalina || CSS || EOS || align=right | 2.1 km || 
|-id=231 bgcolor=#E9E9E9
| 401231 ||  || — || December 15, 2007 || Kitt Peak || Spacewatch || — || align=right | 2.7 km || 
|-id=232 bgcolor=#d6d6d6
| 401232 ||  || — || February 22, 2007 || Catalina || CSS || — || align=right | 3.9 km || 
|-id=233 bgcolor=#d6d6d6
| 401233 ||  || — || October 30, 2010 || Mount Lemmon || Mount Lemmon Survey || — || align=right | 3.7 km || 
|-id=234 bgcolor=#E9E9E9
| 401234 ||  || — || July 5, 2005 || Kitt Peak || Spacewatch || — || align=right | 2.1 km || 
|-id=235 bgcolor=#d6d6d6
| 401235 ||  || — || September 15, 2009 || Mount Lemmon || Mount Lemmon Survey || VER || align=right | 3.3 km || 
|-id=236 bgcolor=#d6d6d6
| 401236 ||  || — || September 18, 2003 || Kitt Peak || Spacewatch || — || align=right | 3.5 km || 
|-id=237 bgcolor=#E9E9E9
| 401237 ||  || — || January 16, 2004 || Kitt Peak || Spacewatch || — || align=right | 1.0 km || 
|-id=238 bgcolor=#d6d6d6
| 401238 ||  || — || March 16, 2007 || Kitt Peak || Spacewatch || — || align=right | 3.5 km || 
|-id=239 bgcolor=#d6d6d6
| 401239 ||  || — || June 16, 2010 || WISE || WISE || — || align=right | 3.4 km || 
|-id=240 bgcolor=#E9E9E9
| 401240 ||  || — || February 2, 2008 || Kitt Peak || Spacewatch || MAR || align=right | 1.2 km || 
|-id=241 bgcolor=#d6d6d6
| 401241 ||  || — || November 13, 2010 || Mount Lemmon || Mount Lemmon Survey || — || align=right | 3.4 km || 
|-id=242 bgcolor=#d6d6d6
| 401242 ||  || — || September 18, 2010 || Mount Lemmon || Mount Lemmon Survey || — || align=right | 3.6 km || 
|-id=243 bgcolor=#d6d6d6
| 401243 ||  || — || January 4, 2012 || Mount Lemmon || Mount Lemmon Survey || — || align=right | 3.4 km || 
|-id=244 bgcolor=#d6d6d6
| 401244 ||  || — || December 24, 2005 || Kitt Peak || Spacewatch || — || align=right | 3.7 km || 
|-id=245 bgcolor=#E9E9E9
| 401245 ||  || — || February 2, 2008 || Kitt Peak || Spacewatch || — || align=right | 1.7 km || 
|-id=246 bgcolor=#E9E9E9
| 401246 ||  || — || February 1, 2003 || Socorro || LINEAR || — || align=right | 3.1 km || 
|-id=247 bgcolor=#E9E9E9
| 401247 ||  || — || February 3, 2008 || Kitt Peak || Spacewatch || (10369) || align=right | 1.3 km || 
|-id=248 bgcolor=#d6d6d6
| 401248 ||  || — || January 21, 2012 || Kitt Peak || Spacewatch || — || align=right | 4.0 km || 
|-id=249 bgcolor=#d6d6d6
| 401249 ||  || — || January 27, 2007 || Mount Lemmon || Mount Lemmon Survey || — || align=right | 2.1 km || 
|-id=250 bgcolor=#E9E9E9
| 401250 ||  || — || December 13, 2006 || Mount Lemmon || Mount Lemmon Survey || NEM || align=right | 2.1 km || 
|-id=251 bgcolor=#d6d6d6
| 401251 ||  || — || November 14, 2010 || Kitt Peak || Spacewatch || — || align=right | 2.9 km || 
|-id=252 bgcolor=#fefefe
| 401252 ||  || — || September 7, 1997 || Caussols || ODAS || — || align=right data-sort-value="0.69" | 690 m || 
|-id=253 bgcolor=#d6d6d6
| 401253 ||  || — || February 22, 2007 || Kitt Peak || Spacewatch || EOS || align=right | 1.7 km || 
|-id=254 bgcolor=#d6d6d6
| 401254 ||  || — || January 17, 2007 || Kitt Peak || Spacewatch || — || align=right | 3.6 km || 
|-id=255 bgcolor=#d6d6d6
| 401255 ||  || — || March 16, 2007 || Kitt Peak || Spacewatch || — || align=right | 3.5 km || 
|-id=256 bgcolor=#d6d6d6
| 401256 ||  || — || January 12, 1996 || Kitt Peak || Spacewatch || — || align=right | 2.5 km || 
|-id=257 bgcolor=#E9E9E9
| 401257 ||  || — || May 13, 2004 || Kitt Peak || Spacewatch || — || align=right | 2.5 km || 
|-id=258 bgcolor=#d6d6d6
| 401258 ||  || — || December 21, 2006 || Mount Lemmon || Mount Lemmon Survey || BRA || align=right | 1.8 km || 
|-id=259 bgcolor=#d6d6d6
| 401259 ||  || — || April 1, 2008 || Mount Lemmon || Mount Lemmon Survey || — || align=right | 2.8 km || 
|-id=260 bgcolor=#d6d6d6
| 401260 ||  || — || December 27, 2005 || Kitt Peak || Spacewatch || — || align=right | 3.2 km || 
|-id=261 bgcolor=#d6d6d6
| 401261 ||  || — || November 2, 2010 || Kitt Peak || Spacewatch || VER || align=right | 3.8 km || 
|-id=262 bgcolor=#d6d6d6
| 401262 ||  || — || February 19, 2001 || Socorro || LINEAR || — || align=right | 3.9 km || 
|-id=263 bgcolor=#d6d6d6
| 401263 ||  || — || August 8, 2004 || Socorro || LINEAR || TEL || align=right | 1.8 km || 
|-id=264 bgcolor=#d6d6d6
| 401264 ||  || — || April 27, 2008 || Mount Lemmon || Mount Lemmon Survey || — || align=right | 3.4 km || 
|-id=265 bgcolor=#d6d6d6
| 401265 ||  || — || April 1, 2008 || Kitt Peak || Spacewatch || EOS || align=right | 2.6 km || 
|-id=266 bgcolor=#d6d6d6
| 401266 ||  || — || February 17, 2001 || Socorro || LINEAR || — || align=right | 3.7 km || 
|-id=267 bgcolor=#d6d6d6
| 401267 ||  || — || May 3, 2008 || Kitt Peak || Spacewatch || — || align=right | 5.2 km || 
|-id=268 bgcolor=#d6d6d6
| 401268 ||  || — || May 26, 2008 || Mount Lemmon || Mount Lemmon Survey || EOS || align=right | 1.8 km || 
|-id=269 bgcolor=#d6d6d6
| 401269 ||  || — || November 29, 2005 || Kitt Peak || Spacewatch || — || align=right | 4.2 km || 
|-id=270 bgcolor=#d6d6d6
| 401270 ||  || — || January 4, 2012 || Mount Lemmon || Mount Lemmon Survey || — || align=right | 3.7 km || 
|-id=271 bgcolor=#d6d6d6
| 401271 ||  || — || August 31, 2003 || Kitt Peak || Spacewatch || — || align=right | 3.7 km || 
|-id=272 bgcolor=#d6d6d6
| 401272 ||  || — || February 21, 2007 || Mount Lemmon || Mount Lemmon Survey || EOS || align=right | 2.0 km || 
|-id=273 bgcolor=#d6d6d6
| 401273 ||  || — || August 18, 2009 || Kitt Peak || Spacewatch || — || align=right | 3.1 km || 
|-id=274 bgcolor=#d6d6d6
| 401274 ||  || — || December 28, 2005 || Kitt Peak || Spacewatch || — || align=right | 4.0 km || 
|-id=275 bgcolor=#d6d6d6
| 401275 ||  || — || March 13, 2007 || Kitt Peak || Spacewatch || (159) || align=right | 2.6 km || 
|-id=276 bgcolor=#d6d6d6
| 401276 ||  || — || May 8, 2008 || Mount Lemmon || Mount Lemmon Survey || — || align=right | 3.4 km || 
|-id=277 bgcolor=#d6d6d6
| 401277 ||  || — || September 8, 2004 || Socorro || LINEAR || — || align=right | 4.2 km || 
|-id=278 bgcolor=#E9E9E9
| 401278 ||  || — || February 8, 2008 || Kitt Peak || Spacewatch || — || align=right | 1.6 km || 
|-id=279 bgcolor=#d6d6d6
| 401279 ||  || — || July 3, 2003 || Kitt Peak || Spacewatch || — || align=right | 3.9 km || 
|-id=280 bgcolor=#d6d6d6
| 401280 ||  || — || November 22, 2005 || Catalina || CSS || — || align=right | 3.2 km || 
|-id=281 bgcolor=#d6d6d6
| 401281 ||  || — || December 27, 2005 || Kitt Peak || Spacewatch || — || align=right | 4.1 km || 
|-id=282 bgcolor=#d6d6d6
| 401282 ||  || — || April 30, 2008 || Mount Lemmon || Mount Lemmon Survey || EOS || align=right | 2.0 km || 
|-id=283 bgcolor=#d6d6d6
| 401283 ||  || — || November 28, 2005 || Kitt Peak || Spacewatch || EOS || align=right | 2.2 km || 
|-id=284 bgcolor=#d6d6d6
| 401284 ||  || — || November 7, 2010 || Mount Lemmon || Mount Lemmon Survey || — || align=right | 3.9 km || 
|-id=285 bgcolor=#d6d6d6
| 401285 ||  || — || August 3, 2008 || Siding Spring || SSS || — || align=right | 4.2 km || 
|-id=286 bgcolor=#d6d6d6
| 401286 ||  || — || August 27, 2009 || Kitt Peak || Spacewatch || — || align=right | 3.7 km || 
|-id=287 bgcolor=#d6d6d6
| 401287 ||  || — || September 30, 2005 || Mount Lemmon || Mount Lemmon Survey || — || align=right | 3.9 km || 
|-id=288 bgcolor=#d6d6d6
| 401288 ||  || — || February 16, 2001 || Kitt Peak || Spacewatch || — || align=right | 3.6 km || 
|-id=289 bgcolor=#d6d6d6
| 401289 ||  || — || September 13, 2005 || Catalina || CSS || BRA || align=right | 1.9 km || 
|-id=290 bgcolor=#E9E9E9
| 401290 ||  || — || October 26, 2005 || Kitt Peak || Spacewatch || AGN || align=right | 1.7 km || 
|-id=291 bgcolor=#E9E9E9
| 401291 ||  || — || September 24, 2000 || Anderson Mesa || LONEOS || GEF || align=right | 1.9 km || 
|-id=292 bgcolor=#d6d6d6
| 401292 ||  || — || October 29, 2005 || Mount Lemmon || Mount Lemmon Survey || KOR || align=right | 1.8 km || 
|-id=293 bgcolor=#d6d6d6
| 401293 ||  || — || September 7, 2008 || Catalina || CSS || SYL7:4 || align=right | 3.6 km || 
|-id=294 bgcolor=#E9E9E9
| 401294 ||  || — || January 27, 2007 || Mount Lemmon || Mount Lemmon Survey || AGN || align=right | 1.2 km || 
|-id=295 bgcolor=#d6d6d6
| 401295 || 2012 FR || — || February 2, 2006 || Mount Lemmon || Mount Lemmon Survey || — || align=right | 4.2 km || 
|-id=296 bgcolor=#d6d6d6
| 401296 ||  || — || April 26, 2007 || Kitt Peak || Spacewatch || — || align=right | 3.7 km || 
|-id=297 bgcolor=#d6d6d6
| 401297 ||  || — || September 19, 2003 || Kitt Peak || Spacewatch || — || align=right | 4.4 km || 
|-id=298 bgcolor=#d6d6d6
| 401298 ||  || — || February 16, 2001 || Socorro || LINEAR || — || align=right | 3.4 km || 
|-id=299 bgcolor=#d6d6d6
| 401299 ||  || — || September 19, 2003 || Kitt Peak || Spacewatch || — || align=right | 3.5 km || 
|-id=300 bgcolor=#d6d6d6
| 401300 ||  || — || March 27, 2004 || Socorro || LINEAR || 3:2 || align=right | 6.4 km || 
|}

401301–401400 

|-bgcolor=#fefefe
| 401301 ||  || — || May 28, 2006 || Kitt Peak || Spacewatch || H || align=right data-sort-value="0.63" | 630 m || 
|-id=302 bgcolor=#E9E9E9
| 401302 ||  || — || October 18, 2003 || Anderson Mesa || LONEOS || EUN || align=right | 1.4 km || 
|-id=303 bgcolor=#fefefe
| 401303 ||  || — || March 2, 2011 || Catalina || CSS || H || align=right data-sort-value="0.55" | 550 m || 
|-id=304 bgcolor=#fefefe
| 401304 ||  || — || November 17, 2001 || Socorro || LINEAR || H || align=right data-sort-value="0.95" | 950 m || 
|-id=305 bgcolor=#fefefe
| 401305 ||  || — || November 26, 2005 || Kitt Peak || Spacewatch || V || align=right data-sort-value="0.80" | 800 m || 
|-id=306 bgcolor=#fefefe
| 401306 ||  || — || December 24, 2005 || Kitt Peak || Spacewatch || — || align=right data-sort-value="0.98" | 980 m || 
|-id=307 bgcolor=#fefefe
| 401307 ||  || — || November 30, 2005 || Kitt Peak || Spacewatch || — || align=right data-sort-value="0.81" | 810 m || 
|-id=308 bgcolor=#fefefe
| 401308 ||  || — || April 24, 2003 || Anderson Mesa || LONEOS || — || align=right | 1.1 km || 
|-id=309 bgcolor=#fefefe
| 401309 ||  || — || January 11, 2005 || Socorro || LINEAR || H || align=right data-sort-value="0.94" | 940 m || 
|-id=310 bgcolor=#fefefe
| 401310 ||  || — || November 7, 2012 || Mount Lemmon || Mount Lemmon Survey || — || align=right data-sort-value="0.77" | 770 m || 
|-id=311 bgcolor=#fefefe
| 401311 ||  || — || January 9, 2002 || Socorro || LINEAR || H || align=right data-sort-value="0.81" | 810 m || 
|-id=312 bgcolor=#fefefe
| 401312 ||  || — || March 5, 2006 || Kitt Peak || Spacewatch || — || align=right data-sort-value="0.88" | 880 m || 
|-id=313 bgcolor=#E9E9E9
| 401313 ||  || — || December 19, 2003 || Socorro || LINEAR || — || align=right | 3.4 km || 
|-id=314 bgcolor=#E9E9E9
| 401314 ||  || — || February 12, 2004 || Kitt Peak || Spacewatch || GEF || align=right | 1.5 km || 
|-id=315 bgcolor=#fefefe
| 401315 ||  || — || February 3, 2008 || Catalina || CSS || H || align=right data-sort-value="0.80" | 800 m || 
|-id=316 bgcolor=#E9E9E9
| 401316 ||  || — || December 1, 2008 || Mount Lemmon || Mount Lemmon Survey || HNSfast? || align=right | 1.5 km || 
|-id=317 bgcolor=#E9E9E9
| 401317 ||  || — || December 10, 2012 || Kitt Peak || Spacewatch || KON || align=right | 2.8 km || 
|-id=318 bgcolor=#E9E9E9
| 401318 ||  || — || April 1, 2009 || Catalina || CSS || — || align=right | 1.7 km || 
|-id=319 bgcolor=#d6d6d6
| 401319 ||  || — || January 8, 2007 || Kitt Peak || Spacewatch || EUP || align=right | 6.5 km || 
|-id=320 bgcolor=#E9E9E9
| 401320 ||  || — || February 26, 2009 || Catalina || CSS || — || align=right | 1.9 km || 
|-id=321 bgcolor=#d6d6d6
| 401321 ||  || — || March 6, 2008 || Mount Lemmon || Mount Lemmon Survey || — || align=right | 3.5 km || 
|-id=322 bgcolor=#d6d6d6
| 401322 ||  || — || January 19, 2008 || Mount Lemmon || Mount Lemmon Survey || — || align=right | 3.8 km || 
|-id=323 bgcolor=#fefefe
| 401323 ||  || — || January 10, 2006 || Mount Lemmon || Mount Lemmon Survey || — || align=right | 1.0 km || 
|-id=324 bgcolor=#E9E9E9
| 401324 ||  || — || October 29, 2008 || Kitt Peak || Spacewatch || — || align=right | 1.5 km || 
|-id=325 bgcolor=#fefefe
| 401325 ||  || — || January 8, 2010 || Mount Lemmon || Mount Lemmon Survey || — || align=right data-sort-value="0.85" | 850 m || 
|-id=326 bgcolor=#E9E9E9
| 401326 ||  || — || September 14, 2006 || Catalina || CSS || — || align=right | 2.1 km || 
|-id=327 bgcolor=#E9E9E9
| 401327 ||  || — || February 2, 2009 || Mount Lemmon || Mount Lemmon Survey || — || align=right | 1.4 km || 
|-id=328 bgcolor=#fefefe
| 401328 ||  || — || June 17, 2010 || Mount Lemmon || Mount Lemmon Survey || — || align=right data-sort-value="0.85" | 850 m || 
|-id=329 bgcolor=#d6d6d6
| 401329 ||  || — || December 16, 2007 || Mount Lemmon || Mount Lemmon Survey || — || align=right | 2.2 km || 
|-id=330 bgcolor=#E9E9E9
| 401330 ||  || — || August 13, 2007 || Siding Spring || SSS || — || align=right | 1.3 km || 
|-id=331 bgcolor=#fefefe
| 401331 ||  || — || December 21, 2008 || Kitt Peak || Spacewatch || — || align=right data-sort-value="0.94" | 940 m || 
|-id=332 bgcolor=#fefefe
| 401332 ||  || — || September 10, 2004 || Socorro || LINEAR || — || align=right data-sort-value="0.91" | 910 m || 
|-id=333 bgcolor=#d6d6d6
| 401333 ||  || — || January 5, 2002 || Kitt Peak || Spacewatch || TIR || align=right | 3.3 km || 
|-id=334 bgcolor=#fefefe
| 401334 ||  || — || November 20, 2007 || Mount Lemmon || Mount Lemmon Survey || H || align=right data-sort-value="0.92" | 920 m || 
|-id=335 bgcolor=#fefefe
| 401335 ||  || — || September 29, 2008 || Mount Lemmon || Mount Lemmon Survey || — || align=right data-sort-value="0.81" | 810 m || 
|-id=336 bgcolor=#fefefe
| 401336 ||  || — || October 28, 2005 || Mount Lemmon || Mount Lemmon Survey || — || align=right | 2.7 km || 
|-id=337 bgcolor=#E9E9E9
| 401337 ||  || — || October 8, 2007 || Catalina || CSS || — || align=right | 2.3 km || 
|-id=338 bgcolor=#fefefe
| 401338 ||  || — || January 20, 2006 || Kitt Peak || Spacewatch || — || align=right | 1.0 km || 
|-id=339 bgcolor=#fefefe
| 401339 ||  || — || November 21, 2008 || Kitt Peak || Spacewatch || — || align=right data-sort-value="0.82" | 820 m || 
|-id=340 bgcolor=#d6d6d6
| 401340 ||  || — || March 31, 2009 || Mount Lemmon || Mount Lemmon Survey || — || align=right | 2.4 km || 
|-id=341 bgcolor=#E9E9E9
| 401341 ||  || — || November 29, 2003 || Kitt Peak || Spacewatch || — || align=right | 1.5 km || 
|-id=342 bgcolor=#E9E9E9
| 401342 ||  || — || November 17, 2007 || Kitt Peak || Spacewatch || — || align=right | 2.0 km || 
|-id=343 bgcolor=#E9E9E9
| 401343 ||  || — || January 19, 2004 || Kitt Peak || Spacewatch || — || align=right | 2.8 km || 
|-id=344 bgcolor=#fefefe
| 401344 ||  || — || September 7, 2008 || Mount Lemmon || Mount Lemmon Survey || — || align=right data-sort-value="0.84" | 840 m || 
|-id=345 bgcolor=#d6d6d6
| 401345 ||  || — || November 27, 2006 || Mount Lemmon || Mount Lemmon Survey || — || align=right | 3.6 km || 
|-id=346 bgcolor=#d6d6d6
| 401346 ||  || — || January 13, 2002 || Socorro || LINEAR || — || align=right | 2.9 km || 
|-id=347 bgcolor=#E9E9E9
| 401347 ||  || — || February 14, 2004 || Socorro || LINEAR || — || align=right | 2.5 km || 
|-id=348 bgcolor=#fefefe
| 401348 ||  || — || October 25, 2005 || Kitt Peak || Spacewatch || (883) || align=right data-sort-value="0.73" | 730 m || 
|-id=349 bgcolor=#E9E9E9
| 401349 ||  || — || March 19, 2009 || Kitt Peak || Spacewatch || MRX || align=right | 1.2 km || 
|-id=350 bgcolor=#fefefe
| 401350 ||  || — || September 24, 2011 || Mount Lemmon || Mount Lemmon Survey || NYS || align=right data-sort-value="0.76" | 760 m || 
|-id=351 bgcolor=#E9E9E9
| 401351 ||  || — || May 10, 2005 || Mount Lemmon || Mount Lemmon Survey || — || align=right | 2.6 km || 
|-id=352 bgcolor=#E9E9E9
| 401352 ||  || — || October 21, 2007 || Mount Lemmon || Mount Lemmon Survey || EUN || align=right | 1.4 km || 
|-id=353 bgcolor=#E9E9E9
| 401353 ||  || — || January 18, 2009 || Kitt Peak || Spacewatch || — || align=right | 1.0 km || 
|-id=354 bgcolor=#E9E9E9
| 401354 ||  || — || December 22, 2008 || Mount Lemmon || Mount Lemmon Survey || HNS || align=right | 1.3 km || 
|-id=355 bgcolor=#E9E9E9
| 401355 ||  || — || February 4, 2009 || Catalina || CSS || EUN || align=right | 1.2 km || 
|-id=356 bgcolor=#fefefe
| 401356 ||  || — || October 4, 2004 || Kitt Peak || Spacewatch || — || align=right | 1.1 km || 
|-id=357 bgcolor=#fefefe
| 401357 ||  || — || May 16, 2006 || Siding Spring || SSS || — || align=right | 1.5 km || 
|-id=358 bgcolor=#E9E9E9
| 401358 ||  || — || November 19, 2003 || Kitt Peak || Spacewatch || — || align=right | 1.6 km || 
|-id=359 bgcolor=#fefefe
| 401359 ||  || — || October 25, 2008 || Kitt Peak || Spacewatch || — || align=right data-sort-value="0.71" | 710 m || 
|-id=360 bgcolor=#fefefe
| 401360 ||  || — || December 6, 2005 || Kitt Peak || Spacewatch || — || align=right data-sort-value="0.83" | 830 m || 
|-id=361 bgcolor=#fefefe
| 401361 ||  || — || March 13, 2010 || Kitt Peak || Spacewatch || — || align=right data-sort-value="0.64" | 640 m || 
|-id=362 bgcolor=#fefefe
| 401362 ||  || — || December 4, 2008 || Mount Lemmon || Mount Lemmon Survey || — || align=right data-sort-value="0.91" | 910 m || 
|-id=363 bgcolor=#E9E9E9
| 401363 ||  || — || April 5, 2005 || Campo Imperatore || CINEOS || — || align=right | 1.6 km || 
|-id=364 bgcolor=#E9E9E9
| 401364 ||  || — || January 29, 2009 || Mount Lemmon || Mount Lemmon Survey || — || align=right | 1.4 km || 
|-id=365 bgcolor=#FA8072
| 401365 ||  || — || November 12, 2004 || Siding Spring || SSS || H || align=right data-sort-value="0.77" | 770 m || 
|-id=366 bgcolor=#E9E9E9
| 401366 ||  || — || April 17, 2009 || Mount Lemmon || Mount Lemmon Survey || — || align=right | 2.6 km || 
|-id=367 bgcolor=#fefefe
| 401367 ||  || — || November 24, 2008 || Mount Lemmon || Mount Lemmon Survey || MAS || align=right data-sort-value="0.81" | 810 m || 
|-id=368 bgcolor=#E9E9E9
| 401368 ||  || — || May 29, 2010 || WISE || WISE || — || align=right | 2.7 km || 
|-id=369 bgcolor=#fefefe
| 401369 ||  || — || January 18, 2013 || Kitt Peak || Spacewatch || — || align=right data-sort-value="0.76" | 760 m || 
|-id=370 bgcolor=#fefefe
| 401370 ||  || — || August 31, 2011 || Siding Spring || SSS || — || align=right data-sort-value="0.96" | 960 m || 
|-id=371 bgcolor=#fefefe
| 401371 ||  || — || February 8, 2010 || WISE || WISE || — || align=right | 1.7 km || 
|-id=372 bgcolor=#fefefe
| 401372 ||  || — || November 1, 2006 || Catalina || CSS || H || align=right | 1.1 km || 
|-id=373 bgcolor=#fefefe
| 401373 ||  || — || September 24, 2008 || Kitt Peak || Spacewatch || — || align=right data-sort-value="0.85" | 850 m || 
|-id=374 bgcolor=#fefefe
| 401374 ||  || — || February 23, 2006 || Kitt Peak || Spacewatch || MAS || align=right data-sort-value="0.86" | 860 m || 
|-id=375 bgcolor=#fefefe
| 401375 || 2013 CC || — || December 20, 2004 || Mount Lemmon || Mount Lemmon Survey || H || align=right data-sort-value="0.70" | 700 m || 
|-id=376 bgcolor=#fefefe
| 401376 || 2013 CE || — || October 26, 2008 || Mount Lemmon || Mount Lemmon Survey || — || align=right data-sort-value="0.83" | 830 m || 
|-id=377 bgcolor=#E9E9E9
| 401377 ||  || — || December 16, 2007 || Mount Lemmon || Mount Lemmon Survey || — || align=right | 1.8 km || 
|-id=378 bgcolor=#fefefe
| 401378 ||  || — || January 8, 2006 || Mount Lemmon || Mount Lemmon Survey || — || align=right | 1.7 km || 
|-id=379 bgcolor=#fefefe
| 401379 ||  || — || December 21, 2008 || Kitt Peak || Spacewatch || — || align=right data-sort-value="0.79" | 790 m || 
|-id=380 bgcolor=#E9E9E9
| 401380 ||  || — || March 21, 2009 || Catalina || CSS || — || align=right | 2.0 km || 
|-id=381 bgcolor=#fefefe
| 401381 ||  || — || January 16, 2009 || Kitt Peak || Spacewatch || — || align=right data-sort-value="0.89" | 890 m || 
|-id=382 bgcolor=#d6d6d6
| 401382 ||  || — || November 17, 2006 || Mount Lemmon || Mount Lemmon Survey || — || align=right | 3.8 km || 
|-id=383 bgcolor=#fefefe
| 401383 ||  || — || August 24, 2007 || Kitt Peak || Spacewatch || — || align=right | 1.00 km || 
|-id=384 bgcolor=#fefefe
| 401384 ||  || — || August 18, 2003 || Campo Imperatore || CINEOS || — || align=right | 1.3 km || 
|-id=385 bgcolor=#E9E9E9
| 401385 ||  || — || December 4, 2007 || Catalina || CSS || ADE || align=right | 1.8 km || 
|-id=386 bgcolor=#fefefe
| 401386 ||  || — || April 24, 2006 || Kitt Peak || Spacewatch || NYS || align=right data-sort-value="0.72" | 720 m || 
|-id=387 bgcolor=#E9E9E9
| 401387 ||  || — || March 16, 2009 || Catalina || CSS || — || align=right | 2.7 km || 
|-id=388 bgcolor=#fefefe
| 401388 ||  || — || November 16, 1998 || Kitt Peak || Spacewatch || — || align=right | 2.5 km || 
|-id=389 bgcolor=#E9E9E9
| 401389 ||  || — || February 25, 2009 || Siding Spring || SSS || — || align=right | 1.7 km || 
|-id=390 bgcolor=#d6d6d6
| 401390 ||  || — || September 29, 2005 || Kitt Peak || Spacewatch || — || align=right | 3.1 km || 
|-id=391 bgcolor=#E9E9E9
| 401391 ||  || — || March 29, 2009 || Siding Spring || SSS || — || align=right | 3.0 km || 
|-id=392 bgcolor=#E9E9E9
| 401392 ||  || — || September 11, 2006 || Catalina || CSS || (194) || align=right | 3.1 km || 
|-id=393 bgcolor=#fefefe
| 401393 ||  || — || March 3, 2006 || Catalina || CSS || — || align=right data-sort-value="0.95" | 950 m || 
|-id=394 bgcolor=#fefefe
| 401394 ||  || — || October 21, 2001 || Kitt Peak || Spacewatch || — || align=right data-sort-value="0.73" | 730 m || 
|-id=395 bgcolor=#d6d6d6
| 401395 ||  || — || September 1, 2005 || Kitt Peak || Spacewatch || — || align=right | 2.5 km || 
|-id=396 bgcolor=#fefefe
| 401396 ||  || — || December 22, 2008 || Mount Lemmon || Mount Lemmon Survey || V || align=right data-sort-value="0.79" | 790 m || 
|-id=397 bgcolor=#E9E9E9
| 401397 ||  || — || November 21, 2003 || Kitt Peak || Spacewatch || — || align=right data-sort-value="0.97" | 970 m || 
|-id=398 bgcolor=#fefefe
| 401398 ||  || — || October 25, 2008 || Kitt Peak || Spacewatch || — || align=right data-sort-value="0.73" | 730 m || 
|-id=399 bgcolor=#E9E9E9
| 401399 ||  || — || December 31, 2008 || Kitt Peak || Spacewatch || — || align=right | 1.6 km || 
|-id=400 bgcolor=#fefefe
| 401400 ||  || — || November 19, 2008 || Mount Lemmon || Mount Lemmon Survey || — || align=right data-sort-value="0.95" | 950 m || 
|}

401401–401500 

|-bgcolor=#d6d6d6
| 401401 ||  || — || October 1, 2005 || Catalina || CSS || — || align=right | 3.3 km || 
|-id=402 bgcolor=#d6d6d6
| 401402 ||  || — || April 12, 2008 || Catalina || CSS || — || align=right | 3.6 km || 
|-id=403 bgcolor=#d6d6d6
| 401403 ||  || — || December 9, 1996 || Kitt Peak || Spacewatch || TEL || align=right | 1.6 km || 
|-id=404 bgcolor=#fefefe
| 401404 ||  || — || April 9, 2006 || Mount Lemmon || Mount Lemmon Survey || NYS || align=right data-sort-value="0.71" | 710 m || 
|-id=405 bgcolor=#E9E9E9
| 401405 ||  || — || December 5, 2007 || Kitt Peak || Spacewatch || — || align=right | 2.8 km || 
|-id=406 bgcolor=#E9E9E9
| 401406 ||  || — || February 27, 2009 || Kitt Peak || Spacewatch || — || align=right | 1.2 km || 
|-id=407 bgcolor=#E9E9E9
| 401407 ||  || — || September 15, 2006 || Kitt Peak || Spacewatch || — || align=right | 1.6 km || 
|-id=408 bgcolor=#E9E9E9
| 401408 ||  || — || February 26, 2009 || Kitt Peak || Spacewatch || EUN || align=right | 1.1 km || 
|-id=409 bgcolor=#E9E9E9
| 401409 ||  || — || February 12, 2004 || Kitt Peak || Spacewatch || — || align=right | 3.0 km || 
|-id=410 bgcolor=#d6d6d6
| 401410 ||  || — || November 16, 2006 || Mount Lemmon || Mount Lemmon Survey || — || align=right | 3.2 km || 
|-id=411 bgcolor=#d6d6d6
| 401411 ||  || — || September 29, 2005 || Kitt Peak || Spacewatch || — || align=right | 2.8 km || 
|-id=412 bgcolor=#fefefe
| 401412 ||  || — || February 25, 2006 || Kitt Peak || Spacewatch || — || align=right data-sort-value="0.69" | 690 m || 
|-id=413 bgcolor=#fefefe
| 401413 ||  || — || January 23, 2006 || Mount Lemmon || Mount Lemmon Survey || — || align=right data-sort-value="0.85" | 850 m || 
|-id=414 bgcolor=#E9E9E9
| 401414 ||  || — || November 5, 2007 || Mount Lemmon || Mount Lemmon Survey || — || align=right | 2.4 km || 
|-id=415 bgcolor=#E9E9E9
| 401415 ||  || — || June 13, 2005 || Kitt Peak || Spacewatch || — || align=right | 2.1 km || 
|-id=416 bgcolor=#fefefe
| 401416 ||  || — || January 13, 1994 || Kitt Peak || Spacewatch || — || align=right data-sort-value="0.99" | 990 m || 
|-id=417 bgcolor=#E9E9E9
| 401417 ||  || — || January 15, 2004 || Kitt Peak || Spacewatch || — || align=right | 1.8 km || 
|-id=418 bgcolor=#E9E9E9
| 401418 ||  || — || October 18, 1998 || Kitt Peak || Spacewatch || — || align=right | 4.5 km || 
|-id=419 bgcolor=#fefefe
| 401419 ||  || — || November 8, 2008 || Mount Lemmon || Mount Lemmon Survey || — || align=right | 1.1 km || 
|-id=420 bgcolor=#d6d6d6
| 401420 ||  || — || March 11, 2008 || Kitt Peak || Spacewatch || — || align=right | 2.5 km || 
|-id=421 bgcolor=#E9E9E9
| 401421 ||  || — || September 27, 2006 || Kitt Peak || Spacewatch || — || align=right | 1.1 km || 
|-id=422 bgcolor=#E9E9E9
| 401422 ||  || — || December 3, 2007 || Kitt Peak || Spacewatch || — || align=right | 2.1 km || 
|-id=423 bgcolor=#E9E9E9
| 401423 ||  || — || October 15, 2007 || Kitt Peak || Spacewatch || — || align=right data-sort-value="0.93" | 930 m || 
|-id=424 bgcolor=#E9E9E9
| 401424 ||  || — || January 31, 2009 || Mount Lemmon || Mount Lemmon Survey || MRX || align=right | 1.2 km || 
|-id=425 bgcolor=#E9E9E9
| 401425 ||  || — || October 3, 2006 || Mount Lemmon || Mount Lemmon Survey || — || align=right | 3.0 km || 
|-id=426 bgcolor=#E9E9E9
| 401426 ||  || — || January 14, 2008 || Kitt Peak || Spacewatch || — || align=right | 2.2 km || 
|-id=427 bgcolor=#d6d6d6
| 401427 ||  || — || January 14, 2008 || Kitt Peak || Spacewatch || — || align=right | 2.5 km || 
|-id=428 bgcolor=#E9E9E9
| 401428 ||  || — || January 8, 2013 || Mount Lemmon || Mount Lemmon Survey || PAD || align=right | 1.7 km || 
|-id=429 bgcolor=#E9E9E9
| 401429 ||  || — || April 10, 2005 || Kitt Peak || Spacewatch || — || align=right | 1.7 km || 
|-id=430 bgcolor=#E9E9E9
| 401430 ||  || — || October 20, 2011 || Kitt Peak || Spacewatch || — || align=right | 2.4 km || 
|-id=431 bgcolor=#E9E9E9
| 401431 ||  || — || February 4, 2009 || Mount Lemmon || Mount Lemmon Survey || — || align=right data-sort-value="0.90" | 900 m || 
|-id=432 bgcolor=#fefefe
| 401432 ||  || — || September 10, 2007 || Mount Lemmon || Mount Lemmon Survey || — || align=right data-sort-value="0.89" | 890 m || 
|-id=433 bgcolor=#d6d6d6
| 401433 ||  || — || March 4, 2008 || Mount Lemmon || Mount Lemmon Survey || — || align=right | 2.7 km || 
|-id=434 bgcolor=#d6d6d6
| 401434 ||  || — || July 20, 1999 || Anderson Mesa || LONEOS || — || align=right | 2.7 km || 
|-id=435 bgcolor=#fefefe
| 401435 ||  || — || May 11, 2010 || Mount Lemmon || Mount Lemmon Survey || V || align=right data-sort-value="0.61" | 610 m || 
|-id=436 bgcolor=#d6d6d6
| 401436 ||  || — || June 9, 2010 || WISE || WISE || — || align=right | 3.3 km || 
|-id=437 bgcolor=#fefefe
| 401437 ||  || — || December 20, 2004 || Mount Lemmon || Mount Lemmon Survey || — || align=right data-sort-value="0.81" | 810 m || 
|-id=438 bgcolor=#E9E9E9
| 401438 ||  || — || March 17, 2009 || Kitt Peak || Spacewatch || — || align=right | 1.6 km || 
|-id=439 bgcolor=#fefefe
| 401439 ||  || — || September 6, 2008 || Catalina || CSS || — || align=right data-sort-value="0.73" | 730 m || 
|-id=440 bgcolor=#fefefe
| 401440 ||  || — || November 9, 2008 || Mount Lemmon || Mount Lemmon Survey || — || align=right data-sort-value="0.77" | 770 m || 
|-id=441 bgcolor=#d6d6d6
| 401441 ||  || — || September 29, 2005 || Kitt Peak || Spacewatch || — || align=right | 3.0 km || 
|-id=442 bgcolor=#fefefe
| 401442 ||  || — || March 3, 2006 || Mount Lemmon || Mount Lemmon Survey || — || align=right data-sort-value="0.85" | 850 m || 
|-id=443 bgcolor=#d6d6d6
| 401443 ||  || — || December 8, 1999 || Kitt Peak || Spacewatch || — || align=right | 3.6 km || 
|-id=444 bgcolor=#d6d6d6
| 401444 ||  || — || December 27, 2006 || Mount Lemmon || Mount Lemmon Survey || — || align=right | 3.3 km || 
|-id=445 bgcolor=#E9E9E9
| 401445 ||  || — || January 17, 2009 || Kitt Peak || Spacewatch || — || align=right data-sort-value="0.94" | 940 m || 
|-id=446 bgcolor=#C2FFFF
| 401446 ||  || — || January 27, 2010 || WISE || WISE || L4 || align=right | 11 km || 
|-id=447 bgcolor=#E9E9E9
| 401447 ||  || — || January 22, 2013 || Mount Lemmon || Mount Lemmon Survey || — || align=right | 2.2 km || 
|-id=448 bgcolor=#E9E9E9
| 401448 ||  || — || February 21, 2001 || Kitt Peak || Spacewatch || — || align=right | 1.1 km || 
|-id=449 bgcolor=#fefefe
| 401449 ||  || — || January 18, 2009 || Kitt Peak || Spacewatch || — || align=right data-sort-value="0.99" | 990 m || 
|-id=450 bgcolor=#E9E9E9
| 401450 ||  || — || February 5, 2009 || Mount Lemmon || Mount Lemmon Survey || WIT || align=right | 1.1 km || 
|-id=451 bgcolor=#fefefe
| 401451 ||  || — || February 25, 2006 || Mount Lemmon || Mount Lemmon Survey || V || align=right data-sort-value="0.65" | 650 m || 
|-id=452 bgcolor=#d6d6d6
| 401452 ||  || — || January 11, 2008 || Mount Lemmon || Mount Lemmon Survey || — || align=right | 2.7 km || 
|-id=453 bgcolor=#E9E9E9
| 401453 ||  || — || April 2, 2009 || Kitt Peak || Spacewatch || — || align=right | 2.7 km || 
|-id=454 bgcolor=#E9E9E9
| 401454 ||  || — || March 16, 2010 || WISE || WISE || — || align=right | 1.2 km || 
|-id=455 bgcolor=#E9E9E9
| 401455 ||  || — || February 4, 2000 || Kitt Peak || Spacewatch || — || align=right | 1.7 km || 
|-id=456 bgcolor=#d6d6d6
| 401456 ||  || — || October 13, 2005 || Kitt Peak || Spacewatch || EOS || align=right | 1.9 km || 
|-id=457 bgcolor=#fefefe
| 401457 ||  || — || January 23, 2006 || Mount Lemmon || Mount Lemmon Survey || V || align=right data-sort-value="0.76" | 760 m || 
|-id=458 bgcolor=#d6d6d6
| 401458 ||  || — || May 5, 2002 || Socorro || LINEAR || EUP || align=right | 3.9 km || 
|-id=459 bgcolor=#E9E9E9
| 401459 ||  || — || December 19, 2007 || Kitt Peak || Spacewatch || — || align=right | 1.7 km || 
|-id=460 bgcolor=#fefefe
| 401460 ||  || — || January 25, 2009 || Kitt Peak || Spacewatch || — || align=right data-sort-value="0.81" | 810 m || 
|-id=461 bgcolor=#d6d6d6
| 401461 ||  || — || April 6, 1994 || Kitt Peak || Spacewatch || — || align=right | 3.2 km || 
|-id=462 bgcolor=#fefefe
| 401462 ||  || — || May 2, 2006 || Mount Lemmon || Mount Lemmon Survey || — || align=right data-sort-value="0.92" | 920 m || 
|-id=463 bgcolor=#fefefe
| 401463 ||  || — || April 29, 2003 || Kitt Peak || Spacewatch || — || align=right | 1.0 km || 
|-id=464 bgcolor=#E9E9E9
| 401464 ||  || — || March 16, 2009 || Mount Lemmon || Mount Lemmon Survey || — || align=right | 1.0 km || 
|-id=465 bgcolor=#E9E9E9
| 401465 ||  || — || October 2, 2006 || Mount Lemmon || Mount Lemmon Survey || — || align=right | 2.1 km || 
|-id=466 bgcolor=#d6d6d6
| 401466 ||  || — || July 2, 1998 || Kitt Peak || Spacewatch || THM || align=right | 2.5 km || 
|-id=467 bgcolor=#fefefe
| 401467 ||  || — || January 7, 2006 || Mount Lemmon || Mount Lemmon Survey || — || align=right data-sort-value="0.99" | 990 m || 
|-id=468 bgcolor=#E9E9E9
| 401468 ||  || — || August 21, 2006 || Kitt Peak || Spacewatch || — || align=right | 2.2 km || 
|-id=469 bgcolor=#E9E9E9
| 401469 ||  || — || October 31, 2011 || Kitt Peak || Spacewatch || — || align=right data-sort-value="0.99" | 990 m || 
|-id=470 bgcolor=#E9E9E9
| 401470 ||  || — || December 31, 2007 || Kitt Peak || Spacewatch || — || align=right | 3.0 km || 
|-id=471 bgcolor=#fefefe
| 401471 ||  || — || November 24, 2008 || Mount Lemmon || Mount Lemmon Survey || — || align=right data-sort-value="0.82" | 820 m || 
|-id=472 bgcolor=#E9E9E9
| 401472 ||  || — || January 2, 2009 || Kitt Peak || Spacewatch || — || align=right | 1.7 km || 
|-id=473 bgcolor=#d6d6d6
| 401473 ||  || — || February 28, 2008 || Mount Lemmon || Mount Lemmon Survey || EOS || align=right | 1.7 km || 
|-id=474 bgcolor=#fefefe
| 401474 ||  || — || October 29, 2005 || Catalina || CSS || — || align=right data-sort-value="0.74" | 740 m || 
|-id=475 bgcolor=#fefefe
| 401475 ||  || — || November 21, 2008 || Mount Lemmon || Mount Lemmon Survey || — || align=right data-sort-value="0.98" | 980 m || 
|-id=476 bgcolor=#E9E9E9
| 401476 ||  || — || November 5, 2007 || Kitt Peak || Spacewatch || — || align=right | 1.2 km || 
|-id=477 bgcolor=#d6d6d6
| 401477 ||  || — || March 21, 2002 || Kitt Peak || Spacewatch || THM || align=right | 2.1 km || 
|-id=478 bgcolor=#d6d6d6
| 401478 ||  || — || January 21, 2002 || Kitt Peak || Spacewatch || EOS || align=right | 1.8 km || 
|-id=479 bgcolor=#d6d6d6
| 401479 ||  || — || March 12, 2002 || Kitt Peak || Spacewatch || EOS || align=right | 2.2 km || 
|-id=480 bgcolor=#fefefe
| 401480 ||  || — || April 14, 2010 || Mount Lemmon || Mount Lemmon Survey || V || align=right data-sort-value="0.65" | 650 m || 
|-id=481 bgcolor=#d6d6d6
| 401481 ||  || — || March 12, 2008 || Kitt Peak || Spacewatch || THM || align=right | 2.1 km || 
|-id=482 bgcolor=#E9E9E9
| 401482 ||  || — || October 16, 2007 || Kitt Peak || Spacewatch || — || align=right data-sort-value="0.88" | 880 m || 
|-id=483 bgcolor=#fefefe
| 401483 ||  || — || September 24, 2000 || Socorro || LINEAR || V || align=right data-sort-value="0.74" | 740 m || 
|-id=484 bgcolor=#d6d6d6
| 401484 ||  || — || September 5, 2010 || Mount Lemmon || Mount Lemmon Survey || — || align=right | 3.1 km || 
|-id=485 bgcolor=#fefefe
| 401485 ||  || — || February 10, 2002 || Socorro || LINEAR || — || align=right data-sort-value="0.90" | 900 m || 
|-id=486 bgcolor=#E9E9E9
| 401486 ||  || — || April 2, 2005 || Siding Spring || SSS || — || align=right | 1.5 km || 
|-id=487 bgcolor=#E9E9E9
| 401487 ||  || — || March 18, 2004 || Kitt Peak || Spacewatch || AGN || align=right | 1.5 km || 
|-id=488 bgcolor=#E9E9E9
| 401488 ||  || — || November 15, 2007 || Mount Lemmon || Mount Lemmon Survey || — || align=right | 1.4 km || 
|-id=489 bgcolor=#E9E9E9
| 401489 ||  || — || April 25, 2000 || Kitt Peak || Spacewatch || — || align=right | 2.1 km || 
|-id=490 bgcolor=#fefefe
| 401490 ||  || — || September 19, 1973 || Palomar || PLS || — || align=right data-sort-value="0.93" | 930 m || 
|-id=491 bgcolor=#fefefe
| 401491 ||  || — || January 23, 2006 || Catalina || CSS || — || align=right data-sort-value="0.88" | 880 m || 
|-id=492 bgcolor=#E9E9E9
| 401492 ||  || — || December 17, 2003 || Kitt Peak || Spacewatch || EUN || align=right | 1.4 km || 
|-id=493 bgcolor=#fefefe
| 401493 ||  || — || September 29, 2003 || Kitt Peak || Spacewatch || — || align=right | 1.1 km || 
|-id=494 bgcolor=#d6d6d6
| 401494 ||  || — || July 17, 2010 || WISE || WISE || LUT || align=right | 5.8 km || 
|-id=495 bgcolor=#fefefe
| 401495 ||  || — || August 22, 2004 || Kitt Peak || Spacewatch || V || align=right data-sort-value="0.55" | 550 m || 
|-id=496 bgcolor=#d6d6d6
| 401496 ||  || — || October 31, 1999 || Kitt Peak || Spacewatch || — || align=right | 3.0 km || 
|-id=497 bgcolor=#d6d6d6
| 401497 ||  || — || December 21, 2006 || Mount Lemmon || Mount Lemmon Survey || — || align=right | 3.2 km || 
|-id=498 bgcolor=#fefefe
| 401498 ||  || — || April 8, 2002 || Kitt Peak || Spacewatch || NYS || align=right data-sort-value="0.74" | 740 m || 
|-id=499 bgcolor=#fefefe
| 401499 ||  || — || September 9, 2007 || Kitt Peak || Spacewatch || — || align=right data-sort-value="0.94" | 940 m || 
|-id=500 bgcolor=#fefefe
| 401500 ||  || — || February 27, 2006 || Kitt Peak || Spacewatch || — || align=right data-sort-value="0.84" | 840 m || 
|}

401501–401600 

|-bgcolor=#E9E9E9
| 401501 ||  || — || March 21, 2004 || Kitt Peak || Spacewatch || — || align=right | 2.2 km || 
|-id=502 bgcolor=#fefefe
| 401502 ||  || — || September 13, 2007 || Mount Lemmon || Mount Lemmon Survey || — || align=right | 2.1 km || 
|-id=503 bgcolor=#E9E9E9
| 401503 ||  || — || April 28, 2009 || Catalina || CSS || — || align=right | 1.9 km || 
|-id=504 bgcolor=#E9E9E9
| 401504 ||  || — || September 18, 2006 || Kitt Peak || Spacewatch ||  || align=right | 2.7 km || 
|-id=505 bgcolor=#E9E9E9
| 401505 ||  || — || February 9, 2008 || Mount Lemmon || Mount Lemmon Survey || — || align=right | 2.5 km || 
|-id=506 bgcolor=#d6d6d6
| 401506 ||  || — || December 27, 2006 || Mount Lemmon || Mount Lemmon Survey || — || align=right | 3.4 km || 
|-id=507 bgcolor=#d6d6d6
| 401507 ||  || — || March 10, 2003 || Kitt Peak || Spacewatch || — || align=right | 2.7 km || 
|-id=508 bgcolor=#d6d6d6
| 401508 ||  || — || October 1, 2010 || Mount Lemmon || Mount Lemmon Survey || — || align=right | 3.4 km || 
|-id=509 bgcolor=#d6d6d6
| 401509 ||  || — || January 15, 2007 || Kitt Peak || Spacewatch || — || align=right | 2.7 km || 
|-id=510 bgcolor=#fefefe
| 401510 ||  || — || September 12, 2007 || Kitt Peak || Spacewatch || V || align=right data-sort-value="0.75" | 750 m || 
|-id=511 bgcolor=#fefefe
| 401511 ||  || — || February 25, 2006 || Kitt Peak || Spacewatch || — || align=right data-sort-value="0.75" | 750 m || 
|-id=512 bgcolor=#fefefe
| 401512 ||  || — || August 24, 2007 || Kitt Peak || Spacewatch || — || align=right | 1.1 km || 
|-id=513 bgcolor=#E9E9E9
| 401513 ||  || — || June 18, 2005 || Mount Lemmon || Mount Lemmon Survey || — || align=right | 2.3 km || 
|-id=514 bgcolor=#E9E9E9
| 401514 ||  || — || August 28, 2006 || Catalina || CSS || — || align=right | 1.2 km || 
|-id=515 bgcolor=#fefefe
| 401515 ||  || — || October 11, 2004 || Kitt Peak || Spacewatch || — || align=right data-sort-value="0.82" | 820 m || 
|-id=516 bgcolor=#E9E9E9
| 401516 ||  || — || August 18, 2006 || Kitt Peak || Spacewatch || AGN || align=right | 1.1 km || 
|-id=517 bgcolor=#d6d6d6
| 401517 ||  || — || March 15, 2008 || Kitt Peak || Spacewatch || — || align=right | 2.8 km || 
|-id=518 bgcolor=#E9E9E9
| 401518 ||  || — || March 12, 2005 || Kitt Peak || Spacewatch || — || align=right | 1.2 km || 
|-id=519 bgcolor=#E9E9E9
| 401519 ||  || — || September 26, 2006 || Kitt Peak || Spacewatch || — || align=right | 1.6 km || 
|-id=520 bgcolor=#E9E9E9
| 401520 ||  || — || April 2, 2005 || Kitt Peak || Spacewatch || — || align=right data-sort-value="0.87" | 870 m || 
|-id=521 bgcolor=#d6d6d6
| 401521 ||  || — || February 12, 2008 || Kitt Peak || Spacewatch || — || align=right | 2.3 km || 
|-id=522 bgcolor=#fefefe
| 401522 ||  || — || October 1, 2003 || Kitt Peak || Spacewatch || — || align=right data-sort-value="0.93" | 930 m || 
|-id=523 bgcolor=#E9E9E9
| 401523 ||  || — || December 19, 2007 || Mount Lemmon || Mount Lemmon Survey || — || align=right | 2.5 km || 
|-id=524 bgcolor=#E9E9E9
| 401524 ||  || — || February 22, 2004 || Kitt Peak || Spacewatch || — || align=right | 2.7 km || 
|-id=525 bgcolor=#E9E9E9
| 401525 ||  || — || March 16, 2004 || Catalina || CSS || — || align=right | 2.6 km || 
|-id=526 bgcolor=#E9E9E9
| 401526 ||  || — || May 13, 2005 || Kitt Peak || Spacewatch || — || align=right | 2.0 km || 
|-id=527 bgcolor=#d6d6d6
| 401527 ||  || — || January 17, 2007 || Kitt Peak || Spacewatch || — || align=right | 3.4 km || 
|-id=528 bgcolor=#E9E9E9
| 401528 ||  || — || December 22, 2003 || Socorro || LINEAR || — || align=right | 1.3 km || 
|-id=529 bgcolor=#E9E9E9
| 401529 ||  || — || March 29, 2000 || Kitt Peak || Spacewatch || — || align=right | 1.4 km || 
|-id=530 bgcolor=#E9E9E9
| 401530 ||  || — || March 14, 2004 || Socorro || LINEAR || — || align=right | 2.5 km || 
|-id=531 bgcolor=#E9E9E9
| 401531 ||  || — || November 18, 2007 || Mount Lemmon || Mount Lemmon Survey || — || align=right | 2.5 km || 
|-id=532 bgcolor=#E9E9E9
| 401532 ||  || — || August 21, 2006 || Kitt Peak || Spacewatch || — || align=right | 1.0 km || 
|-id=533 bgcolor=#d6d6d6
| 401533 ||  || — || February 8, 2007 || Mount Lemmon || Mount Lemmon Survey || — || align=right | 3.9 km || 
|-id=534 bgcolor=#d6d6d6
| 401534 ||  || — || November 2, 2010 || Mount Lemmon || Mount Lemmon Survey || — || align=right | 2.8 km || 
|-id=535 bgcolor=#d6d6d6
| 401535 ||  || — || April 1, 2008 || Kitt Peak || Spacewatch || — || align=right | 4.1 km || 
|-id=536 bgcolor=#E9E9E9
| 401536 ||  || — || March 4, 2000 || Socorro || LINEAR || — || align=right | 1.8 km || 
|-id=537 bgcolor=#E9E9E9
| 401537 ||  || — || March 18, 2009 || Kitt Peak || Spacewatch || — || align=right | 1.6 km || 
|-id=538 bgcolor=#d6d6d6
| 401538 ||  || — || October 21, 2006 || Mount Lemmon || Mount Lemmon Survey || — || align=right | 2.3 km || 
|-id=539 bgcolor=#E9E9E9
| 401539 ||  || — || October 11, 2007 || Kitt Peak || Spacewatch || — || align=right | 1.1 km || 
|-id=540 bgcolor=#d6d6d6
| 401540 ||  || — || June 19, 1998 || Kitt Peak || Spacewatch || SHU3:2 || align=right | 7.3 km || 
|-id=541 bgcolor=#E9E9E9
| 401541 ||  || — || April 6, 2005 || Catalina || CSS || EUN || align=right | 1.4 km || 
|-id=542 bgcolor=#E9E9E9
| 401542 ||  || — || May 10, 2005 || Mount Lemmon || Mount Lemmon Survey || — || align=right | 1.5 km || 
|-id=543 bgcolor=#E9E9E9
| 401543 ||  || — || August 10, 2010 || Kitt Peak || Spacewatch || — || align=right | 2.0 km || 
|-id=544 bgcolor=#E9E9E9
| 401544 ||  || — || November 19, 2007 || Mount Lemmon || Mount Lemmon Survey || — || align=right | 2.6 km || 
|-id=545 bgcolor=#d6d6d6
| 401545 ||  || — || October 24, 2005 || Kitt Peak || Spacewatch || — || align=right | 3.5 km || 
|-id=546 bgcolor=#E9E9E9
| 401546 ||  || — || February 14, 2004 || Kitt Peak || Spacewatch || — || align=right | 1.6 km || 
|-id=547 bgcolor=#E9E9E9
| 401547 ||  || — || September 16, 2006 || Kitt Peak || Spacewatch || — || align=right | 1.5 km || 
|-id=548 bgcolor=#fefefe
| 401548 ||  || — || April 20, 2006 || Kitt Peak || Spacewatch || — || align=right data-sort-value="0.88" | 880 m || 
|-id=549 bgcolor=#E9E9E9
| 401549 ||  || — || March 28, 2009 || Mount Lemmon || Mount Lemmon Survey || — || align=right | 1.9 km || 
|-id=550 bgcolor=#E9E9E9
| 401550 ||  || — || November 12, 2006 || Mount Lemmon || Mount Lemmon Survey || HOF || align=right | 2.1 km || 
|-id=551 bgcolor=#d6d6d6
| 401551 ||  || — || August 18, 2009 || Kitt Peak || Spacewatch || — || align=right | 3.0 km || 
|-id=552 bgcolor=#d6d6d6
| 401552 ||  || — || April 7, 2003 || Kitt Peak || Spacewatch || EOS || align=right | 2.3 km || 
|-id=553 bgcolor=#E9E9E9
| 401553 ||  || — || March 15, 2004 || Socorro || LINEAR || — || align=right | 2.6 km || 
|-id=554 bgcolor=#d6d6d6
| 401554 ||  || — || April 17, 2008 || Mount Lemmon || Mount Lemmon Survey || — || align=right | 3.8 km || 
|-id=555 bgcolor=#fefefe
| 401555 ||  || — || March 13, 2007 || Mount Lemmon || Mount Lemmon Survey || — || align=right data-sort-value="0.53" | 530 m || 
|-id=556 bgcolor=#E9E9E9
| 401556 ||  || — || October 18, 2006 || Kitt Peak || Spacewatch || — || align=right | 2.8 km || 
|-id=557 bgcolor=#E9E9E9
| 401557 ||  || — || October 24, 2011 || Kitt Peak || Spacewatch || — || align=right | 1.8 km || 
|-id=558 bgcolor=#d6d6d6
| 401558 ||  || — || September 13, 2005 || Catalina || CSS || 615 || align=right | 1.8 km || 
|-id=559 bgcolor=#d6d6d6
| 401559 ||  || — || February 16, 2007 || Catalina || CSS || — || align=right | 4.3 km || 
|-id=560 bgcolor=#E9E9E9
| 401560 ||  || — || August 29, 2006 || Catalina || CSS || — || align=right | 1.3 km || 
|-id=561 bgcolor=#E9E9E9
| 401561 ||  || — || October 16, 2006 || Catalina || CSS || — || align=right | 2.1 km || 
|-id=562 bgcolor=#E9E9E9
| 401562 ||  || — || October 3, 2006 || Mount Lemmon || Mount Lemmon Survey || — || align=right | 1.7 km || 
|-id=563 bgcolor=#fefefe
| 401563 ||  || — || April 8, 2006 || Kitt Peak || Spacewatch || — || align=right | 1.1 km || 
|-id=564 bgcolor=#d6d6d6
| 401564 ||  || — || March 7, 2008 || Mount Lemmon || Mount Lemmon Survey || — || align=right | 2.5 km || 
|-id=565 bgcolor=#E9E9E9
| 401565 ||  || — || February 20, 2009 || Mount Lemmon || Mount Lemmon Survey || EUN || align=right | 1.2 km || 
|-id=566 bgcolor=#E9E9E9
| 401566 ||  || — || June 13, 2005 || Mount Lemmon || Mount Lemmon Survey || — || align=right | 3.5 km || 
|-id=567 bgcolor=#d6d6d6
| 401567 ||  || — || August 29, 2009 || Kitt Peak || Spacewatch || — || align=right | 2.6 km || 
|-id=568 bgcolor=#fefefe
| 401568 ||  || — || January 15, 2009 || Kitt Peak || Spacewatch || — || align=right | 1.0 km || 
|-id=569 bgcolor=#d6d6d6
| 401569 ||  || — || January 2, 2012 || Kitt Peak || Spacewatch || — || align=right | 3.7 km || 
|-id=570 bgcolor=#E9E9E9
| 401570 ||  || — || April 18, 2009 || Kitt Peak || Spacewatch || — || align=right | 1.8 km || 
|-id=571 bgcolor=#d6d6d6
| 401571 ||  || — || November 23, 2006 || Kitt Peak || Spacewatch || — || align=right | 2.3 km || 
|-id=572 bgcolor=#d6d6d6
| 401572 ||  || — || February 10, 2002 || Socorro || LINEAR || — || align=right | 2.7 km || 
|-id=573 bgcolor=#fefefe
| 401573 ||  || — || November 5, 2007 || Kitt Peak || Spacewatch || NYS || align=right data-sort-value="0.86" | 860 m || 
|-id=574 bgcolor=#d6d6d6
| 401574 ||  || — || August 28, 2005 || Kitt Peak || Spacewatch || KOR || align=right | 1.8 km || 
|-id=575 bgcolor=#E9E9E9
| 401575 ||  || — || April 14, 2005 || Kitt Peak || Spacewatch || — || align=right | 2.9 km || 
|-id=576 bgcolor=#E9E9E9
| 401576 ||  || — || October 21, 2006 || Kitt Peak || Spacewatch || AGN || align=right | 1.4 km || 
|-id=577 bgcolor=#d6d6d6
| 401577 ||  || — || August 12, 2010 || Kitt Peak || Spacewatch || — || align=right | 3.6 km || 
|-id=578 bgcolor=#fefefe
| 401578 ||  || — || December 18, 2001 || Socorro || LINEAR || — || align=right | 1.00 km || 
|-id=579 bgcolor=#d6d6d6
| 401579 ||  || — || April 11, 2008 || Kitt Peak || Spacewatch || — || align=right | 4.8 km || 
|-id=580 bgcolor=#d6d6d6
| 401580 ||  || — || February 21, 2007 || Kitt Peak || Spacewatch || THM || align=right | 2.4 km || 
|-id=581 bgcolor=#d6d6d6
| 401581 ||  || — || May 29, 2003 || Kitt Peak || Spacewatch || — || align=right | 3.4 km || 
|-id=582 bgcolor=#fefefe
| 401582 ||  || — || October 14, 2007 || Mount Lemmon || Mount Lemmon Survey || — || align=right | 1.0 km || 
|-id=583 bgcolor=#E9E9E9
| 401583 ||  || — || November 21, 2006 || Mount Lemmon || Mount Lemmon Survey || — || align=right | 2.8 km || 
|-id=584 bgcolor=#fefefe
| 401584 ||  || — || May 25, 2006 || Kitt Peak || Spacewatch || — || align=right data-sort-value="0.89" | 890 m || 
|-id=585 bgcolor=#d6d6d6
| 401585 ||  || — || September 15, 2004 || Kitt Peak || Spacewatch || — || align=right | 3.3 km || 
|-id=586 bgcolor=#d6d6d6
| 401586 ||  || — || November 1, 2005 || Mount Lemmon || Mount Lemmon Survey || THM || align=right | 2.9 km || 
|-id=587 bgcolor=#d6d6d6
| 401587 ||  || — || October 4, 2004 || Kitt Peak || Spacewatch || EOS || align=right | 2.3 km || 
|-id=588 bgcolor=#d6d6d6
| 401588 ||  || — || September 10, 2004 || Kitt Peak || Spacewatch || — || align=right | 2.8 km || 
|-id=589 bgcolor=#E9E9E9
| 401589 ||  || — || March 17, 2004 || Kitt Peak || Spacewatch || — || align=right | 2.3 km || 
|-id=590 bgcolor=#E9E9E9
| 401590 ||  || — || November 18, 2006 || Kitt Peak || Spacewatch || AGN || align=right | 1.5 km || 
|-id=591 bgcolor=#E9E9E9
| 401591 ||  || — || August 28, 2005 || Kitt Peak || Spacewatch || — || align=right | 2.3 km || 
|-id=592 bgcolor=#E9E9E9
| 401592 ||  || — || November 16, 2006 || Kitt Peak || Spacewatch || AGN || align=right | 1.3 km || 
|-id=593 bgcolor=#E9E9E9
| 401593 ||  || — || February 12, 2004 || Kitt Peak || Spacewatch || — || align=right | 2.9 km || 
|-id=594 bgcolor=#E9E9E9
| 401594 ||  || — || March 21, 2009 || Kitt Peak || Spacewatch || — || align=right | 1.4 km || 
|-id=595 bgcolor=#d6d6d6
| 401595 ||  || — || March 10, 2007 || Mount Lemmon || Mount Lemmon Survey || — || align=right | 3.3 km || 
|-id=596 bgcolor=#d6d6d6
| 401596 ||  || — || July 14, 2010 || WISE || WISE || — || align=right | 4.2 km || 
|-id=597 bgcolor=#d6d6d6
| 401597 ||  || — || September 11, 2004 || Kitt Peak || Spacewatch || — || align=right | 3.4 km || 
|-id=598 bgcolor=#E9E9E9
| 401598 ||  || — || March 6, 2008 || Mount Lemmon || Mount Lemmon Survey || — || align=right | 2.8 km || 
|-id=599 bgcolor=#d6d6d6
| 401599 ||  || — || January 14, 2012 || Mount Lemmon || Mount Lemmon Survey || — || align=right | 4.7 km || 
|-id=600 bgcolor=#fefefe
| 401600 ||  || — || December 18, 2001 || Socorro || LINEAR || (2076) || align=right data-sort-value="0.98" | 980 m || 
|}

401601–401700 

|-bgcolor=#d6d6d6
| 401601 ||  || — || December 24, 2006 || Kitt Peak || Spacewatch || — || align=right | 2.5 km || 
|-id=602 bgcolor=#E9E9E9
| 401602 ||  || — || November 13, 2006 || Catalina || CSS || — || align=right | 3.2 km || 
|-id=603 bgcolor=#d6d6d6
| 401603 ||  || — || November 21, 2006 || Mount Lemmon || Mount Lemmon Survey || EOS || align=right | 2.2 km || 
|-id=604 bgcolor=#E9E9E9
| 401604 ||  || — || April 13, 2004 || Catalina || CSS || — || align=right | 2.8 km || 
|-id=605 bgcolor=#fefefe
| 401605 ||  || — || October 11, 2007 || Catalina || CSS || — || align=right | 1.1 km || 
|-id=606 bgcolor=#E9E9E9
| 401606 ||  || — || September 19, 2006 || Catalina || CSS || — || align=right | 3.2 km || 
|-id=607 bgcolor=#d6d6d6
| 401607 ||  || — || November 26, 2005 || Catalina || CSS || EOS || align=right | 2.5 km || 
|-id=608 bgcolor=#d6d6d6
| 401608 ||  || — || December 29, 2011 || Mount Lemmon || Mount Lemmon Survey || — || align=right | 3.0 km || 
|-id=609 bgcolor=#E9E9E9
| 401609 ||  || — || April 10, 2005 || Mount Lemmon || Mount Lemmon Survey || — || align=right | 1.2 km || 
|-id=610 bgcolor=#E9E9E9
| 401610 ||  || — || September 5, 1996 || Kitt Peak || Spacewatch || — || align=right | 2.5 km || 
|-id=611 bgcolor=#d6d6d6
| 401611 ||  || — || July 29, 2010 || WISE || WISE || — || align=right | 4.1 km || 
|-id=612 bgcolor=#E9E9E9
| 401612 ||  || — || May 11, 2010 || WISE || WISE || — || align=right | 1.2 km || 
|-id=613 bgcolor=#d6d6d6
| 401613 ||  || — || March 5, 2008 || Kitt Peak || Spacewatch || — || align=right | 2.8 km || 
|-id=614 bgcolor=#fefefe
| 401614 ||  || — || March 23, 2006 || Kitt Peak || Spacewatch || — || align=right data-sort-value="0.85" | 850 m || 
|-id=615 bgcolor=#E9E9E9
| 401615 ||  || — || April 24, 2004 || Kitt Peak || Spacewatch || — || align=right | 2.7 km || 
|-id=616 bgcolor=#E9E9E9
| 401616 ||  || — || April 28, 2004 || Kitt Peak || Spacewatch || AGN || align=right | 1.1 km || 
|-id=617 bgcolor=#d6d6d6
| 401617 ||  || — || November 3, 2010 || Kitt Peak || Spacewatch || — || align=right | 4.2 km || 
|-id=618 bgcolor=#d6d6d6
| 401618 ||  || — || January 10, 2006 || Mount Lemmon || Mount Lemmon Survey || — || align=right | 3.7 km || 
|-id=619 bgcolor=#d6d6d6
| 401619 ||  || — || December 30, 2005 || Kitt Peak || Spacewatch || — || align=right | 3.1 km || 
|-id=620 bgcolor=#d6d6d6
| 401620 ||  || — || October 29, 2010 || Kitt Peak || Spacewatch || — || align=right | 3.7 km || 
|-id=621 bgcolor=#fefefe
| 401621 ||  || — || October 21, 1995 || Kitt Peak || Spacewatch || — || align=right | 1.00 km || 
|-id=622 bgcolor=#E9E9E9
| 401622 ||  || — || March 19, 1996 || Kitt Peak || Spacewatch || — || align=right | 1.6 km || 
|-id=623 bgcolor=#fefefe
| 401623 ||  || — || April 2, 2006 || Kitt Peak || Spacewatch || — || align=right data-sort-value="0.73" | 730 m || 
|-id=624 bgcolor=#d6d6d6
| 401624 ||  || — || February 21, 2007 || Mount Lemmon || Mount Lemmon Survey || HYG || align=right | 2.3 km || 
|-id=625 bgcolor=#d6d6d6
| 401625 ||  || — || December 29, 2011 || Kitt Peak || Spacewatch || — || align=right | 3.8 km || 
|-id=626 bgcolor=#d6d6d6
| 401626 ||  || — || October 25, 2005 || Kitt Peak || Spacewatch || — || align=right | 3.3 km || 
|-id=627 bgcolor=#fefefe
| 401627 ||  || — || September 11, 2007 || Mount Lemmon || Mount Lemmon Survey || — || align=right data-sort-value="0.91" | 910 m || 
|-id=628 bgcolor=#d6d6d6
| 401628 ||  || — || February 6, 2007 || Mount Lemmon || Mount Lemmon Survey || — || align=right | 2.6 km || 
|-id=629 bgcolor=#E9E9E9
| 401629 ||  || — || October 1, 2005 || Kitt Peak || Spacewatch || AGN || align=right | 1.6 km || 
|-id=630 bgcolor=#fefefe
| 401630 ||  || — || November 7, 2007 || Kitt Peak || Spacewatch || — || align=right | 1.0 km || 
|-id=631 bgcolor=#d6d6d6
| 401631 ||  || — || April 9, 2003 || Kitt Peak || Spacewatch || — || align=right | 3.2 km || 
|-id=632 bgcolor=#d6d6d6
| 401632 ||  || — || April 14, 2008 || Kitt Peak || Spacewatch || — || align=right | 2.4 km || 
|-id=633 bgcolor=#d6d6d6
| 401633 ||  || — || October 8, 2004 || Kitt Peak || Spacewatch || — || align=right | 3.2 km || 
|-id=634 bgcolor=#E9E9E9
| 401634 ||  || — || February 2, 2000 || Prescott || P. G. Comba || MAR || align=right | 1.5 km || 
|-id=635 bgcolor=#E9E9E9
| 401635 ||  || — || March 31, 2009 || Mount Lemmon || Mount Lemmon Survey || EUN || align=right | 1.2 km || 
|-id=636 bgcolor=#d6d6d6
| 401636 ||  || — || December 27, 2006 || Mount Lemmon || Mount Lemmon Survey || — || align=right | 3.6 km || 
|-id=637 bgcolor=#E9E9E9
| 401637 ||  || — || September 30, 2006 || Mount Lemmon || Mount Lemmon Survey ||  || align=right | 2.5 km || 
|-id=638 bgcolor=#d6d6d6
| 401638 ||  || — || September 17, 2009 || Mount Lemmon || Mount Lemmon Survey || — || align=right | 3.5 km || 
|-id=639 bgcolor=#d6d6d6
| 401639 ||  || — || March 13, 2007 || Kitt Peak || Spacewatch || — || align=right | 3.2 km || 
|-id=640 bgcolor=#E9E9E9
| 401640 ||  || — || September 17, 2006 || Catalina || CSS || — || align=right | 1.9 km || 
|-id=641 bgcolor=#d6d6d6
| 401641 ||  || — || November 13, 1999 || Kitt Peak || Spacewatch || TIR || align=right | 3.9 km || 
|-id=642 bgcolor=#d6d6d6
| 401642 ||  || — || January 21, 2001 || Socorro || LINEAR || LIX || align=right | 5.5 km || 
|-id=643 bgcolor=#E9E9E9
| 401643 ||  || — || March 16, 2009 || Kitt Peak || Spacewatch || MAR || align=right | 1.1 km || 
|-id=644 bgcolor=#fefefe
| 401644 ||  || — || January 9, 2002 || Socorro || LINEAR || — || align=right | 1.0 km || 
|-id=645 bgcolor=#d6d6d6
| 401645 ||  || — || October 7, 2010 || Mount Lemmon || Mount Lemmon Survey || EOS || align=right | 2.6 km || 
|-id=646 bgcolor=#E9E9E9
| 401646 ||  || — || October 23, 2006 || Kitt Peak || Spacewatch || — || align=right | 2.6 km || 
|-id=647 bgcolor=#d6d6d6
| 401647 ||  || — || February 10, 2007 || Catalina || CSS || — || align=right | 4.0 km || 
|-id=648 bgcolor=#d6d6d6
| 401648 ||  || — || September 11, 2004 || Kitt Peak || Spacewatch || — || align=right | 3.0 km || 
|-id=649 bgcolor=#d6d6d6
| 401649 ||  || — || December 3, 2010 || Mount Lemmon || Mount Lemmon Survey || — || align=right | 3.6 km || 
|-id=650 bgcolor=#d6d6d6
| 401650 ||  || — || November 3, 2010 || Kitt Peak || Spacewatch || — || align=right | 4.7 km || 
|-id=651 bgcolor=#E9E9E9
| 401651 ||  || — || December 21, 2003 || Socorro || LINEAR || RAF || align=right data-sort-value="0.97" | 970 m || 
|-id=652 bgcolor=#E9E9E9
| 401652 ||  || — || December 1, 2003 || Kitt Peak || Spacewatch || — || align=right data-sort-value="0.93" | 930 m || 
|-id=653 bgcolor=#E9E9E9
| 401653 ||  || — || September 17, 2006 || Kitt Peak || Spacewatch || MAR || align=right data-sort-value="0.99" | 990 m || 
|-id=654 bgcolor=#d6d6d6
| 401654 ||  || — || November 24, 2006 || Mount Lemmon || Mount Lemmon Survey || — || align=right | 4.8 km || 
|-id=655 bgcolor=#d6d6d6
| 401655 ||  || — || March 14, 2007 || Mount Lemmon || Mount Lemmon Survey || HYG || align=right | 3.5 km || 
|-id=656 bgcolor=#d6d6d6
| 401656 ||  || — || January 17, 2007 || Kitt Peak || Spacewatch || — || align=right | 3.1 km || 
|-id=657 bgcolor=#E9E9E9
| 401657 ||  || — || March 21, 2004 || Kitt Peak || Spacewatch || — || align=right | 2.3 km || 
|-id=658 bgcolor=#d6d6d6
| 401658 ||  || — || March 9, 2007 || Catalina || CSS || — || align=right | 3.7 km || 
|-id=659 bgcolor=#d6d6d6
| 401659 ||  || — || February 13, 2001 || Kitt Peak || Spacewatch || EOS || align=right | 2.7 km || 
|-id=660 bgcolor=#d6d6d6
| 401660 ||  || — || October 13, 2010 || Mount Lemmon || Mount Lemmon Survey || TIR || align=right | 3.4 km || 
|-id=661 bgcolor=#d6d6d6
| 401661 ||  || — || December 26, 2005 || Kitt Peak || Spacewatch || — || align=right | 4.0 km || 
|-id=662 bgcolor=#d6d6d6
| 401662 ||  || — || October 25, 2005 || Mount Lemmon || Mount Lemmon Survey || — || align=right | 3.0 km || 
|-id=663 bgcolor=#d6d6d6
| 401663 ||  || — || November 4, 1999 || Kitt Peak || Spacewatch || — || align=right | 3.4 km || 
|-id=664 bgcolor=#E9E9E9
| 401664 ||  || — || October 10, 2005 || Catalina || CSS || — || align=right | 3.2 km || 
|-id=665 bgcolor=#fefefe
| 401665 ||  || — || February 4, 2006 || Kitt Peak || Spacewatch || — || align=right data-sort-value="0.72" | 720 m || 
|-id=666 bgcolor=#E9E9E9
| 401666 ||  || — || December 5, 2002 || Kitt Peak || Spacewatch || — || align=right | 1.8 km || 
|-id=667 bgcolor=#d6d6d6
| 401667 ||  || — || September 23, 2004 || Kitt Peak || Spacewatch || — || align=right | 2.9 km || 
|-id=668 bgcolor=#d6d6d6
| 401668 ||  || — || October 7, 2004 || Kitt Peak || Spacewatch || — || align=right | 2.7 km || 
|-id=669 bgcolor=#E9E9E9
| 401669 ||  || — || November 23, 2006 || Kitt Peak || Spacewatch || — || align=right | 2.3 km || 
|-id=670 bgcolor=#d6d6d6
| 401670 ||  || — || October 10, 2004 || Kitt Peak || Spacewatch || — || align=right | 3.4 km || 
|-id=671 bgcolor=#d6d6d6
| 401671 ||  || — || October 3, 1999 || Kitt Peak || Spacewatch || EOS || align=right | 1.8 km || 
|-id=672 bgcolor=#d6d6d6
| 401672 ||  || — || December 28, 2005 || Kitt Peak || Spacewatch || — || align=right | 3.1 km || 
|-id=673 bgcolor=#E9E9E9
| 401673 ||  || — || November 1, 2006 || Mount Lemmon || Mount Lemmon Survey || — || align=right | 2.8 km || 
|-id=674 bgcolor=#E9E9E9
| 401674 ||  || — || December 20, 2007 || Kitt Peak || Spacewatch || — || align=right | 1.2 km || 
|-id=675 bgcolor=#d6d6d6
| 401675 ||  || — || February 27, 2007 || Kitt Peak || Spacewatch || — || align=right | 3.6 km || 
|-id=676 bgcolor=#E9E9E9
| 401676 ||  || — || April 6, 2005 || Mount Lemmon || Mount Lemmon Survey || — || align=right | 1.5 km || 
|-id=677 bgcolor=#d6d6d6
| 401677 ||  || — || January 6, 2012 || Kitt Peak || Spacewatch || 3:2 || align=right | 3.5 km || 
|-id=678 bgcolor=#d6d6d6
| 401678 ||  || — || October 5, 2004 || Kitt Peak || Spacewatch || — || align=right | 2.9 km || 
|-id=679 bgcolor=#E9E9E9
| 401679 ||  || — || November 14, 1998 || Kitt Peak || Spacewatch || — || align=right | 1.6 km || 
|-id=680 bgcolor=#d6d6d6
| 401680 ||  || — || March 29, 2008 || Kitt Peak || Spacewatch || — || align=right | 2.4 km || 
|-id=681 bgcolor=#d6d6d6
| 401681 ||  || — || December 4, 2010 || Mount Lemmon || Mount Lemmon Survey || — || align=right | 3.5 km || 
|-id=682 bgcolor=#E9E9E9
| 401682 ||  || — || January 2, 2012 || Mount Lemmon || Mount Lemmon Survey || — || align=right | 3.1 km || 
|-id=683 bgcolor=#d6d6d6
| 401683 ||  || — || November 2, 2010 || Mount Lemmon || Mount Lemmon Survey || HYG || align=right | 2.5 km || 
|-id=684 bgcolor=#E9E9E9
| 401684 ||  || — || November 5, 2007 || Mount Lemmon || Mount Lemmon Survey || — || align=right | 1.7 km || 
|-id=685 bgcolor=#d6d6d6
| 401685 ||  || — || January 2, 2012 || Mount Lemmon || Mount Lemmon Survey || — || align=right | 3.6 km || 
|-id=686 bgcolor=#d6d6d6
| 401686 ||  || — || March 11, 2007 || Kitt Peak || Spacewatch || — || align=right | 3.0 km || 
|-id=687 bgcolor=#d6d6d6
| 401687 ||  || — || April 13, 2008 || Mount Lemmon || Mount Lemmon Survey || — || align=right | 2.7 km || 
|-id=688 bgcolor=#d6d6d6
| 401688 ||  || — || February 27, 2007 || Kitt Peak || Spacewatch || — || align=right | 2.8 km || 
|-id=689 bgcolor=#d6d6d6
| 401689 ||  || — || October 12, 1996 || Kitt Peak || Spacewatch || BRA || align=right | 2.0 km || 
|-id=690 bgcolor=#d6d6d6
| 401690 ||  || — || April 1, 2008 || Kitt Peak || Spacewatch || — || align=right | 2.2 km || 
|-id=691 bgcolor=#d6d6d6
| 401691 ||  || — || December 5, 2005 || Kitt Peak || Spacewatch || THM || align=right | 2.4 km || 
|-id=692 bgcolor=#d6d6d6
| 401692 ||  || — || December 3, 2010 || Mount Lemmon || Mount Lemmon Survey || — || align=right | 3.4 km || 
|-id=693 bgcolor=#d6d6d6
| 401693 ||  || — || September 16, 2010 || Mount Lemmon || Mount Lemmon Survey || — || align=right | 3.6 km || 
|-id=694 bgcolor=#d6d6d6
| 401694 ||  || — || April 15, 2002 || Kitt Peak || Spacewatch || EOS || align=right | 2.7 km || 
|-id=695 bgcolor=#d6d6d6
| 401695 ||  || — || February 12, 2008 || Mount Lemmon || Mount Lemmon Survey || — || align=right | 3.5 km || 
|-id=696 bgcolor=#d6d6d6
| 401696 ||  || — || December 5, 2005 || Mount Lemmon || Mount Lemmon Survey || — || align=right | 3.1 km || 
|-id=697 bgcolor=#d6d6d6
| 401697 ||  || — || December 22, 2005 || Kitt Peak || Spacewatch || — || align=right | 4.2 km || 
|-id=698 bgcolor=#d6d6d6
| 401698 ||  || — || November 26, 2005 || Mount Lemmon || Mount Lemmon Survey || — || align=right | 2.3 km || 
|-id=699 bgcolor=#E9E9E9
| 401699 ||  || — || October 4, 2006 || Mount Lemmon || Mount Lemmon Survey || WIT || align=right | 1.0 km || 
|-id=700 bgcolor=#E9E9E9
| 401700 ||  || — || November 18, 2006 || Mount Lemmon || Mount Lemmon Survey || — || align=right | 1.9 km || 
|}

401701–401800 

|-bgcolor=#d6d6d6
| 401701 ||  || — || October 17, 2010 || Mount Lemmon || Mount Lemmon Survey || — || align=right | 2.9 km || 
|-id=702 bgcolor=#E9E9E9
| 401702 ||  || — || October 29, 2010 || Mount Lemmon || Mount Lemmon Survey || — || align=right | 2.3 km || 
|-id=703 bgcolor=#d6d6d6
| 401703 ||  || — || May 27, 2008 || Kitt Peak || Spacewatch || — || align=right | 3.0 km || 
|-id=704 bgcolor=#E9E9E9
| 401704 ||  || — || September 16, 2010 || Kitt Peak || Spacewatch || — || align=right | 2.2 km || 
|-id=705 bgcolor=#d6d6d6
| 401705 ||  || — || November 12, 1999 || Kitt Peak || Spacewatch || — || align=right | 2.5 km || 
|-id=706 bgcolor=#E9E9E9
| 401706 ||  || — || January 18, 2008 || Kitt Peak || Spacewatch || — || align=right | 1.1 km || 
|-id=707 bgcolor=#E9E9E9
| 401707 ||  || — || August 21, 2006 || Kitt Peak || Spacewatch || — || align=right data-sort-value="0.98" | 980 m || 
|-id=708 bgcolor=#E9E9E9
| 401708 ||  || — || October 14, 2001 || Socorro || LINEAR || — || align=right | 2.0 km || 
|-id=709 bgcolor=#fefefe
| 401709 ||  || — || September 19, 1995 || Kitt Peak || Spacewatch || — || align=right data-sort-value="0.90" | 900 m || 
|-id=710 bgcolor=#d6d6d6
| 401710 ||  || — || January 27, 2007 || Kitt Peak || Spacewatch || — || align=right | 2.9 km || 
|-id=711 bgcolor=#d6d6d6
| 401711 ||  || — || April 4, 2003 || Kitt Peak || Spacewatch || KOR || align=right | 1.3 km || 
|-id=712 bgcolor=#d6d6d6
| 401712 ||  || — || September 5, 2010 || Mount Lemmon || Mount Lemmon Survey || EOS || align=right | 2.0 km || 
|-id=713 bgcolor=#E9E9E9
| 401713 ||  || — || September 15, 2010 || Kitt Peak || Spacewatch || — || align=right | 2.4 km || 
|-id=714 bgcolor=#E9E9E9
| 401714 ||  || — || October 18, 1998 || Kitt Peak || Spacewatch || — || align=right | 1.3 km || 
|-id=715 bgcolor=#d6d6d6
| 401715 ||  || — || December 4, 2005 || Kitt Peak || Spacewatch || — || align=right | 2.4 km || 
|-id=716 bgcolor=#fefefe
| 401716 ||  || — || March 10, 2005 || Mount Lemmon || Mount Lemmon Survey || NYS || align=right data-sort-value="0.86" | 860 m || 
|-id=717 bgcolor=#E9E9E9
| 401717 ||  || — || September 30, 2010 || Mount Lemmon || Mount Lemmon Survey || AGN || align=right | 1.1 km || 
|-id=718 bgcolor=#d6d6d6
| 401718 ||  || — || March 31, 2008 || Mount Lemmon || Mount Lemmon Survey || KOR || align=right | 1.2 km || 
|-id=719 bgcolor=#d6d6d6
| 401719 ||  || — || March 26, 2008 || Mount Lemmon || Mount Lemmon Survey || KOR || align=right | 1.2 km || 
|-id=720 bgcolor=#d6d6d6
| 401720 ||  || — || April 9, 2008 || Kitt Peak || Spacewatch || KOR || align=right | 1.1 km || 
|-id=721 bgcolor=#d6d6d6
| 401721 ||  || — || April 26, 2008 || Mount Lemmon || Mount Lemmon Survey || — || align=right | 2.9 km || 
|-id=722 bgcolor=#E9E9E9
| 401722 ||  || — || April 5, 2005 || Mount Lemmon || Mount Lemmon Survey || — || align=right | 1.0 km || 
|-id=723 bgcolor=#d6d6d6
| 401723 ||  || — || November 11, 2005 || Kitt Peak || Spacewatch || — || align=right | 3.2 km || 
|-id=724 bgcolor=#d6d6d6
| 401724 ||  || — || September 18, 2009 || Kitt Peak || Spacewatch || — || align=right | 3.8 km || 
|-id=725 bgcolor=#d6d6d6
| 401725 ||  || — || November 28, 2005 || Kitt Peak || Spacewatch || — || align=right | 3.8 km || 
|-id=726 bgcolor=#d6d6d6
| 401726 ||  || — || December 14, 2004 || Socorro || LINEAR || VER || align=right | 3.9 km || 
|-id=727 bgcolor=#d6d6d6
| 401727 ||  || — || October 8, 2004 || Kitt Peak || Spacewatch || — || align=right | 3.6 km || 
|-id=728 bgcolor=#E9E9E9
| 401728 ||  || — || October 19, 2011 || Kitt Peak || Spacewatch || — || align=right | 1.6 km || 
|-id=729 bgcolor=#d6d6d6
| 401729 ||  || — || December 17, 2006 || Mount Lemmon || Mount Lemmon Survey || — || align=right | 2.9 km || 
|-id=730 bgcolor=#d6d6d6
| 401730 ||  || — || November 16, 1999 || Kitt Peak || Spacewatch || — || align=right | 3.0 km || 
|-id=731 bgcolor=#E9E9E9
| 401731 ||  || — || August 30, 2005 || Kitt Peak || Spacewatch || AGN || align=right | 1.3 km || 
|-id=732 bgcolor=#d6d6d6
| 401732 ||  || — || April 18, 2002 || Kitt Peak || Spacewatch || THM || align=right | 2.8 km || 
|-id=733 bgcolor=#d6d6d6
| 401733 ||  || — || March 20, 2007 || Catalina || CSS || — || align=right | 4.6 km || 
|-id=734 bgcolor=#d6d6d6
| 401734 ||  || — || January 27, 2006 || Kitt Peak || Spacewatch || — || align=right | 3.1 km || 
|-id=735 bgcolor=#d6d6d6
| 401735 ||  || — || February 26, 2007 || Mount Lemmon || Mount Lemmon Survey || LUT || align=right | 5.5 km || 
|-id=736 bgcolor=#d6d6d6
| 401736 ||  || — || September 28, 2003 || Socorro || LINEAR || — || align=right | 3.6 km || 
|-id=737 bgcolor=#E9E9E9
| 401737 ||  || — || November 18, 2006 || Mount Lemmon || Mount Lemmon Survey || WIT || align=right | 1.2 km || 
|-id=738 bgcolor=#d6d6d6
| 401738 ||  || — || November 29, 2005 || Mount Lemmon || Mount Lemmon Survey || — || align=right | 3.9 km || 
|-id=739 bgcolor=#d6d6d6
| 401739 ||  || — || December 3, 2010 || Mount Lemmon || Mount Lemmon Survey || ELF || align=right | 4.8 km || 
|-id=740 bgcolor=#d6d6d6
| 401740 ||  || — || November 28, 2006 || Kitt Peak || Spacewatch || — || align=right | 4.0 km || 
|-id=741 bgcolor=#d6d6d6
| 401741 ||  || — || November 16, 1999 || Kitt Peak || Spacewatch || EOS || align=right | 2.4 km || 
|-id=742 bgcolor=#d6d6d6
| 401742 ||  || — || October 15, 2004 || Kitt Peak || Spacewatch || — || align=right | 2.8 km || 
|-id=743 bgcolor=#d6d6d6
| 401743 ||  || — || October 5, 2004 || Kitt Peak || Spacewatch || — || align=right | 2.7 km || 
|-id=744 bgcolor=#E9E9E9
| 401744 ||  || — || August 29, 2005 || Kitt Peak || Spacewatch || — || align=right | 2.5 km || 
|-id=745 bgcolor=#fefefe
| 401745 ||  || — || December 5, 2007 || Mount Lemmon || Mount Lemmon Survey || — || align=right data-sort-value="0.97" | 970 m || 
|-id=746 bgcolor=#d6d6d6
| 401746 ||  || — || October 9, 2004 || Kitt Peak || Spacewatch || — || align=right | 3.0 km || 
|-id=747 bgcolor=#d6d6d6
| 401747 ||  || — || December 30, 2005 || Mount Lemmon || Mount Lemmon Survey || — || align=right | 2.8 km || 
|-id=748 bgcolor=#d6d6d6
| 401748 ||  || — || December 30, 2005 || Kitt Peak || Spacewatch || — || align=right | 3.1 km || 
|-id=749 bgcolor=#d6d6d6
| 401749 ||  || — || October 1, 2005 || Kitt Peak || Spacewatch || KOR || align=right | 1.5 km || 
|-id=750 bgcolor=#E9E9E9
| 401750 ||  || — || May 18, 2004 || Campo Imperatore || CINEOS || — || align=right | 2.4 km || 
|-id=751 bgcolor=#d6d6d6
| 401751 ||  || — || October 28, 2010 || Mount Lemmon || Mount Lemmon Survey || — || align=right | 3.4 km || 
|-id=752 bgcolor=#d6d6d6
| 401752 ||  || — || September 19, 2003 || Kitt Peak || Spacewatch || — || align=right | 3.0 km || 
|-id=753 bgcolor=#d6d6d6
| 401753 ||  || — || October 29, 2010 || Kitt Peak || Spacewatch || TEL || align=right | 1.7 km || 
|-id=754 bgcolor=#d6d6d6
| 401754 ||  || — || December 6, 2005 || Kitt Peak || Spacewatch || — || align=right | 3.2 km || 
|-id=755 bgcolor=#d6d6d6
| 401755 ||  || — || October 28, 1994 || Kitt Peak || Spacewatch || — || align=right | 2.8 km || 
|-id=756 bgcolor=#d6d6d6
| 401756 ||  || — || March 16, 2007 || Kitt Peak || Spacewatch || — || align=right | 3.5 km || 
|-id=757 bgcolor=#d6d6d6
| 401757 ||  || — || December 25, 2005 || Kitt Peak || Spacewatch || — || align=right | 2.7 km || 
|-id=758 bgcolor=#E9E9E9
| 401758 ||  || — || November 11, 2007 || Mount Lemmon || Mount Lemmon Survey || — || align=right | 1.2 km || 
|-id=759 bgcolor=#d6d6d6
| 401759 ||  || — || November 6, 2010 || Mount Lemmon || Mount Lemmon Survey || — || align=right | 2.8 km || 
|-id=760 bgcolor=#d6d6d6
| 401760 ||  || — || November 19, 2004 || Kitt Peak || Spacewatch || — || align=right | 3.7 km || 
|-id=761 bgcolor=#d6d6d6
| 401761 ||  || — || December 29, 2005 || Kitt Peak || Spacewatch || — || align=right | 4.0 km || 
|-id=762 bgcolor=#d6d6d6
| 401762 ||  || — || February 1, 2006 || Kitt Peak || Spacewatch || — || align=right | 3.1 km || 
|-id=763 bgcolor=#d6d6d6
| 401763 ||  || — || April 24, 2007 || Kitt Peak || Spacewatch || — || align=right | 5.8 km || 
|-id=764 bgcolor=#d6d6d6
| 401764 ||  || — || September 17, 2003 || Kitt Peak || Spacewatch || — || align=right | 3.5 km || 
|-id=765 bgcolor=#d6d6d6
| 401765 ||  || — || January 7, 2006 || Mount Lemmon || Mount Lemmon Survey || VER || align=right | 4.8 km || 
|-id=766 bgcolor=#d6d6d6
| 401766 ||  || — || October 14, 1998 || Kitt Peak || Spacewatch || — || align=right | 3.2 km || 
|-id=767 bgcolor=#d6d6d6
| 401767 ||  || — || November 9, 2004 || Catalina || CSS || — || align=right | 4.1 km || 
|-id=768 bgcolor=#d6d6d6
| 401768 ||  || — || December 22, 2000 || Kitt Peak || Spacewatch || — || align=right | 3.7 km || 
|-id=769 bgcolor=#d6d6d6
| 401769 ||  || — || October 16, 2009 || Catalina || CSS || — || align=right | 4.2 km || 
|-id=770 bgcolor=#E9E9E9
| 401770 ||  || — || July 5, 2000 || Anderson Mesa || LONEOS || (5) || align=right | 1.1 km || 
|-id=771 bgcolor=#d6d6d6
| 401771 ||  || — || November 17, 2006 || Kitt Peak || Spacewatch || — || align=right | 7.6 km || 
|-id=772 bgcolor=#d6d6d6
| 401772 ||  || — || March 7, 2003 || Socorro || LINEAR || — || align=right | 4.2 km || 
|-id=773 bgcolor=#E9E9E9
| 401773 ||  || — || March 9, 2005 || Catalina || CSS || — || align=right | 3.1 km || 
|-id=774 bgcolor=#d6d6d6
| 401774 ||  || — || March 30, 2003 || Kitt Peak || Spacewatch || THM || align=right | 2.5 km || 
|-id=775 bgcolor=#E9E9E9
| 401775 ||  || — || February 2, 2005 || Kitt Peak || Spacewatch || — || align=right | 2.3 km || 
|-id=776 bgcolor=#E9E9E9
| 401776 ||  || — || September 21, 2007 || XuYi || PMO NEO || — || align=right | 2.2 km || 
|-id=777 bgcolor=#E9E9E9
| 401777 ||  || — || March 11, 2005 || Mount Lemmon || Mount Lemmon Survey || EUN || align=right | 1.3 km || 
|-id=778 bgcolor=#d6d6d6
| 401778 ||  || — || June 8, 2004 || Kitt Peak || Spacewatch || — || align=right | 3.3 km || 
|-id=779 bgcolor=#E9E9E9
| 401779 ||  || — || September 5, 2007 || Catalina || CSS || — || align=right | 1.6 km || 
|-id=780 bgcolor=#fefefe
| 401780 ||  || — || September 4, 2007 || Catalina || CSS || — || align=right | 1.2 km || 
|-id=781 bgcolor=#d6d6d6
| 401781 ||  || — || September 28, 2006 || Mount Lemmon || Mount Lemmon Survey || — || align=right | 5.5 km || 
|-id=782 bgcolor=#d6d6d6
| 401782 ||  || — || March 3, 2009 || Catalina || CSS || — || align=right | 3.4 km || 
|-id=783 bgcolor=#d6d6d6
| 401783 ||  || — || November 11, 2007 || Mount Lemmon || Mount Lemmon Survey || — || align=right | 3.3 km || 
|-id=784 bgcolor=#E9E9E9
| 401784 ||  || — || October 11, 2007 || Mount Lemmon || Mount Lemmon Survey || — || align=right | 2.5 km || 
|-id=785 bgcolor=#E9E9E9
| 401785 ||  || — || December 18, 2000 || Kitt Peak || Spacewatch || — || align=right | 1.2 km || 
|-id=786 bgcolor=#fefefe
| 401786 ||  || — || March 14, 2007 || Mount Lemmon || Mount Lemmon Survey || — || align=right data-sort-value="0.83" | 830 m || 
|-id=787 bgcolor=#fefefe
| 401787 ||  || — || April 14, 2004 || Kitt Peak || Spacewatch || — || align=right data-sort-value="0.76" | 760 m || 
|-id=788 bgcolor=#d6d6d6
| 401788 ||  || — || July 21, 2004 || Siding Spring || SSS || Tj (2.97) || align=right | 4.9 km || 
|-id=789 bgcolor=#E9E9E9
| 401789 ||  || — || February 20, 2001 || Socorro || LINEAR || — || align=right | 1.6 km || 
|-id=790 bgcolor=#fefefe
| 401790 ||  || — || March 23, 2003 || Kitt Peak || Spacewatch || MAS || align=right data-sort-value="0.68" | 680 m || 
|-id=791 bgcolor=#fefefe
| 401791 ||  || — || September 21, 2001 || Socorro || LINEAR || V || align=right data-sort-value="0.88" | 880 m || 
|-id=792 bgcolor=#d6d6d6
| 401792 ||  || — || April 7, 2003 || Kitt Peak || Spacewatch || — || align=right | 3.4 km || 
|-id=793 bgcolor=#fefefe
| 401793 ||  || — || October 4, 2004 || Kitt Peak || Spacewatch || — || align=right | 1.0 km || 
|-id=794 bgcolor=#E9E9E9
| 401794 ||  || — || April 18, 2005 || Kitt Peak || Spacewatch || — || align=right | 1.9 km || 
|-id=795 bgcolor=#fefefe
| 401795 ||  || — || February 17, 2010 || Kitt Peak || Spacewatch || — || align=right data-sort-value="0.69" | 690 m || 
|-id=796 bgcolor=#d6d6d6
| 401796 ||  || — || January 16, 2008 || Mount Lemmon || Mount Lemmon Survey || — || align=right | 3.5 km || 
|-id=797 bgcolor=#E9E9E9
| 401797 ||  || — || February 13, 2010 || Kitt Peak || Spacewatch || EUN || align=right | 1.6 km || 
|-id=798 bgcolor=#E9E9E9
| 401798 ||  || — || May 13, 2005 || Mount Lemmon || Mount Lemmon Survey || — || align=right | 2.0 km || 
|-id=799 bgcolor=#E9E9E9
| 401799 ||  || — || February 9, 2005 || Socorro || LINEAR || — || align=right | 1.4 km || 
|-id=800 bgcolor=#E9E9E9
| 401800 ||  || — || January 16, 2005 || Kitt Peak || Spacewatch || EUN || align=right | 1.4 km || 
|}

401801–401900 

|-bgcolor=#E9E9E9
| 401801 ||  || — || February 28, 2009 || Catalina || CSS || — || align=right | 2.7 km || 
|-id=802 bgcolor=#E9E9E9
| 401802 ||  || — || May 4, 2005 || Kitt Peak || Spacewatch || — || align=right | 2.8 km || 
|-id=803 bgcolor=#E9E9E9
| 401803 ||  || — || March 1, 2009 || Kitt Peak || Spacewatch || AGN || align=right | 1.5 km || 
|-id=804 bgcolor=#E9E9E9
| 401804 ||  || — || February 5, 2000 || Kitt Peak || Spacewatch || LEO || align=right | 2.7 km || 
|-id=805 bgcolor=#E9E9E9
| 401805 ||  || — || July 30, 2006 || Siding Spring || SSS || — || align=right | 2.3 km || 
|-id=806 bgcolor=#d6d6d6
| 401806 ||  || — || July 13, 2004 || Siding Spring || SSS || — || align=right | 6.0 km || 
|-id=807 bgcolor=#E9E9E9
| 401807 ||  || — || October 4, 2007 || Kitt Peak || Spacewatch || MAR || align=right | 1.1 km || 
|-id=808 bgcolor=#fefefe
| 401808 ||  || — || January 25, 2006 || Mount Lemmon || Mount Lemmon Survey || — || align=right data-sort-value="0.93" | 930 m || 
|-id=809 bgcolor=#FA8072
| 401809 || 3195 T-2 || — || September 30, 1973 || Palomar || PLS || — || align=right data-sort-value="0.82" | 820 m || 
|-id=810 bgcolor=#fefefe
| 401810 || 3165 T-3 || — || October 16, 1977 || Palomar || PLS || — || align=right | 1.1 km || 
|-id=811 bgcolor=#E9E9E9
| 401811 ||  || — || March 7, 1981 || Siding Spring || S. J. Bus || — || align=right | 2.4 km || 
|-id=812 bgcolor=#fefefe
| 401812 ||  || — || January 8, 1994 || Kitt Peak || Spacewatch || — || align=right data-sort-value="0.82" | 820 m || 
|-id=813 bgcolor=#fefefe
| 401813 ||  || — || September 5, 1994 || Kitt Peak || Spacewatch || — || align=right data-sort-value="0.70" | 700 m || 
|-id=814 bgcolor=#fefefe
| 401814 ||  || — || November 28, 1994 || Kitt Peak || Spacewatch || (2076) || align=right data-sort-value="0.70" | 700 m || 
|-id=815 bgcolor=#E9E9E9
| 401815 ||  || — || June 29, 1995 || Kitt Peak || Spacewatch || — || align=right | 2.1 km || 
|-id=816 bgcolor=#fefefe
| 401816 ||  || — || September 20, 1995 || Kitt Peak || Spacewatch || — || align=right data-sort-value="0.42" | 420 m || 
|-id=817 bgcolor=#fefefe
| 401817 ||  || — || September 30, 1995 || Kitt Peak || Spacewatch || — || align=right data-sort-value="0.49" | 490 m || 
|-id=818 bgcolor=#d6d6d6
| 401818 ||  || — || October 19, 1995 || Kitt Peak || Spacewatch || KOR || align=right data-sort-value="0.99" | 990 m || 
|-id=819 bgcolor=#fefefe
| 401819 ||  || — || October 24, 1995 || Kitt Peak || Spacewatch || — || align=right data-sort-value="0.86" | 860 m || 
|-id=820 bgcolor=#E9E9E9
| 401820 Špilas ||  ||  || September 30, 1996 || Kleť || Kleť Obs. || — || align=right | 2.7 km || 
|-id=821 bgcolor=#d6d6d6
| 401821 ||  || — || September 23, 1997 || Kitt Peak || Spacewatch || — || align=right | 3.2 km || 
|-id=822 bgcolor=#E9E9E9
| 401822 ||  || — || November 24, 1997 || Kitt Peak || Spacewatch || DOR || align=right | 2.7 km || 
|-id=823 bgcolor=#d6d6d6
| 401823 ||  || — || August 26, 1998 || Kitt Peak || Spacewatch || EMA || align=right | 3.1 km || 
|-id=824 bgcolor=#FA8072
| 401824 ||  || — || August 17, 1998 || Socorro || LINEAR || — || align=right data-sort-value="0.91" | 910 m || 
|-id=825 bgcolor=#d6d6d6
| 401825 ||  || — || September 13, 1998 || Kitt Peak || Spacewatch || — || align=right | 2.0 km || 
|-id=826 bgcolor=#d6d6d6
| 401826 ||  || — || September 13, 1998 || Kitt Peak || Spacewatch || — || align=right | 3.3 km || 
|-id=827 bgcolor=#E9E9E9
| 401827 ||  || — || September 21, 1998 || Caussols || ODAS || — || align=right data-sort-value="0.84" | 840 m || 
|-id=828 bgcolor=#d6d6d6
| 401828 ||  || — || September 20, 1998 || Kitt Peak || Spacewatch || EOS || align=right | 2.0 km || 
|-id=829 bgcolor=#E9E9E9
| 401829 ||  || — || September 20, 1998 || Kitt Peak || Spacewatch || — || align=right data-sort-value="0.71" | 710 m || 
|-id=830 bgcolor=#d6d6d6
| 401830 ||  || — || September 26, 1998 || Socorro || LINEAR || — || align=right | 3.3 km || 
|-id=831 bgcolor=#d6d6d6
| 401831 ||  || — || September 25, 1998 || Kitt Peak || Spacewatch || — || align=right | 3.4 km || 
|-id=832 bgcolor=#E9E9E9
| 401832 ||  || — || October 13, 1998 || Kitt Peak || Spacewatch || (5) || align=right data-sort-value="0.84" | 840 m || 
|-id=833 bgcolor=#d6d6d6
| 401833 ||  || — || November 19, 1998 || Kitt Peak || Spacewatch || — || align=right | 3.0 km || 
|-id=834 bgcolor=#fefefe
| 401834 ||  || — || October 10, 1999 || Socorro || LINEAR || V || align=right data-sort-value="0.87" | 870 m || 
|-id=835 bgcolor=#fefefe
| 401835 ||  || — || October 9, 1999 || Kitt Peak || Spacewatch || — || align=right | 1.1 km || 
|-id=836 bgcolor=#d6d6d6
| 401836 ||  || — || October 1, 1999 || Catalina || CSS || SHU3:2 || align=right | 6.4 km || 
|-id=837 bgcolor=#d6d6d6
| 401837 ||  || — || October 31, 1999 || Kitt Peak || Spacewatch || — || align=right | 2.2 km || 
|-id=838 bgcolor=#d6d6d6
| 401838 ||  || — || October 31, 1999 || Kitt Peak || Spacewatch || — || align=right | 3.4 km || 
|-id=839 bgcolor=#d6d6d6
| 401839 ||  || — || October 19, 1999 || Kitt Peak || Spacewatch || — || align=right | 1.7 km || 
|-id=840 bgcolor=#FA8072
| 401840 ||  || — || October 20, 1999 || Kitt Peak || Spacewatch || — || align=right data-sort-value="0.78" | 780 m || 
|-id=841 bgcolor=#fefefe
| 401841 ||  || — || November 5, 1999 || Kitt Peak || Spacewatch || — || align=right data-sort-value="0.70" | 700 m || 
|-id=842 bgcolor=#fefefe
| 401842 ||  || — || November 6, 1999 || Kitt Peak || Spacewatch || — || align=right data-sort-value="0.73" | 730 m || 
|-id=843 bgcolor=#d6d6d6
| 401843 ||  || — || November 4, 1999 || Socorro || LINEAR || criticalTj (2.97) || align=right | 3.4 km || 
|-id=844 bgcolor=#fefefe
| 401844 ||  || — || November 9, 1999 || Socorro || LINEAR || — || align=right data-sort-value="0.79" | 790 m || 
|-id=845 bgcolor=#d6d6d6
| 401845 ||  || — || November 5, 1999 || Kitt Peak || Spacewatch || SHU3:2 || align=right | 4.8 km || 
|-id=846 bgcolor=#d6d6d6
| 401846 ||  || — || November 28, 1999 || Kitt Peak || Spacewatch || — || align=right | 3.2 km || 
|-id=847 bgcolor=#FA8072
| 401847 ||  || — || November 16, 1999 || Catalina || CSS || — || align=right | 2.3 km || 
|-id=848 bgcolor=#d6d6d6
| 401848 ||  || — || November 16, 1999 || Kitt Peak || Spacewatch || Tj (2.96) || align=right | 3.5 km || 
|-id=849 bgcolor=#d6d6d6
| 401849 ||  || — || December 7, 1999 || Socorro || LINEAR || — || align=right | 2.4 km || 
|-id=850 bgcolor=#d6d6d6
| 401850 ||  || — || January 5, 2000 || Socorro || LINEAR || — || align=right | 6.3 km || 
|-id=851 bgcolor=#fefefe
| 401851 ||  || — || January 3, 2000 || Kitt Peak || Spacewatch || — || align=right data-sort-value="0.75" | 750 m || 
|-id=852 bgcolor=#E9E9E9
| 401852 ||  || — || December 31, 1999 || Kitt Peak || Spacewatch || — || align=right data-sort-value="0.93" | 930 m || 
|-id=853 bgcolor=#E9E9E9
| 401853 ||  || — || February 29, 2000 || Socorro || LINEAR || EUN || align=right | 1.2 km || 
|-id=854 bgcolor=#E9E9E9
| 401854 ||  || — || March 3, 2000 || Socorro || LINEAR || — || align=right | 2.0 km || 
|-id=855 bgcolor=#E9E9E9
| 401855 ||  || — || April 28, 2000 || Anderson Mesa || LONEOS || — || align=right | 2.0 km || 
|-id=856 bgcolor=#FFC2E0
| 401856 ||  || — || May 29, 2000 || Socorro || LINEAR || APOPHA || align=right data-sort-value="0.31" | 310 m || 
|-id=857 bgcolor=#FFC2E0
| 401857 ||  || — || August 1, 2000 || Socorro || LINEAR || APO +1km || align=right | 4.2 km || 
|-id=858 bgcolor=#FA8072
| 401858 ||  || — || August 25, 2000 || Socorro || LINEAR || — || align=right data-sort-value="0.98" | 980 m || 
|-id=859 bgcolor=#fefefe
| 401859 ||  || — || August 24, 2000 || Socorro || LINEAR || — || align=right | 1.0 km || 
|-id=860 bgcolor=#fefefe
| 401860 ||  || — || August 26, 2000 || Socorro || LINEAR || — || align=right data-sort-value="0.71" | 710 m || 
|-id=861 bgcolor=#fefefe
| 401861 ||  || — || September 3, 2000 || Kitt Peak || Spacewatch || — || align=right data-sort-value="0.72" | 720 m || 
|-id=862 bgcolor=#fefefe
| 401862 ||  || — || September 24, 2000 || Socorro || LINEAR || — || align=right data-sort-value="0.80" | 800 m || 
|-id=863 bgcolor=#E9E9E9
| 401863 ||  || — || September 24, 2000 || Socorro || LINEAR ||  || align=right | 2.0 km || 
|-id=864 bgcolor=#fefefe
| 401864 ||  || — || September 28, 2000 || Socorro || LINEAR || — || align=right data-sort-value="0.91" | 910 m || 
|-id=865 bgcolor=#fefefe
| 401865 ||  || — || October 1, 2000 || Socorro || LINEAR || — || align=right data-sort-value="0.91" | 910 m || 
|-id=866 bgcolor=#d6d6d6
| 401866 ||  || — || October 2, 2000 || Socorro || LINEAR || — || align=right | 3.1 km || 
|-id=867 bgcolor=#fefefe
| 401867 ||  || — || October 2, 2000 || Socorro || LINEAR || — || align=right data-sort-value="0.91" | 910 m || 
|-id=868 bgcolor=#FA8072
| 401868 ||  || — || November 1, 2000 || Socorro || LINEAR || — || align=right data-sort-value="0.72" | 720 m || 
|-id=869 bgcolor=#d6d6d6
| 401869 ||  || — || November 3, 2000 || Socorro || LINEAR || — || align=right | 2.4 km || 
|-id=870 bgcolor=#d6d6d6
| 401870 ||  || — || November 22, 2000 || Kitt Peak || Spacewatch || EOS || align=right | 2.3 km || 
|-id=871 bgcolor=#FA8072
| 401871 ||  || — || November 21, 2000 || Socorro || LINEAR || — || align=right data-sort-value="0.85" | 850 m || 
|-id=872 bgcolor=#d6d6d6
| 401872 ||  || — || January 26, 2001 || Socorro || LINEAR || — || align=right | 5.6 km || 
|-id=873 bgcolor=#d6d6d6
| 401873 ||  || — || February 1, 2001 || Socorro || LINEAR || — || align=right | 3.3 km || 
|-id=874 bgcolor=#d6d6d6
| 401874 ||  || — || March 19, 2001 || Socorro || LINEAR || — || align=right | 3.9 km || 
|-id=875 bgcolor=#E9E9E9
| 401875 ||  || — || May 18, 2001 || Socorro || LINEAR || — || align=right | 1.2 km || 
|-id=876 bgcolor=#E9E9E9
| 401876 ||  || — || July 22, 2001 || Ondřejov || P. Pravec, L. Kotková || — || align=right | 2.0 km || 
|-id=877 bgcolor=#E9E9E9
| 401877 ||  || — || July 22, 2001 || Ondřejov || P. Pravec, L. Kotková || — || align=right | 1.2 km || 
|-id=878 bgcolor=#E9E9E9
| 401878 ||  || — || July 27, 2001 || Palomar || NEAT || — || align=right | 2.2 km || 
|-id=879 bgcolor=#E9E9E9
| 401879 ||  || — || July 31, 2001 || Palomar || NEAT || — || align=right | 1.5 km || 
|-id=880 bgcolor=#E9E9E9
| 401880 ||  || — || August 10, 2001 || Palomar || NEAT || JUN || align=right | 1.7 km || 
|-id=881 bgcolor=#E9E9E9
| 401881 ||  || — || August 24, 2001 || Haleakala || NEAT || — || align=right | 3.8 km || 
|-id=882 bgcolor=#E9E9E9
| 401882 ||  || — || July 21, 2001 || Anderson Mesa || LONEOS || — || align=right | 2.4 km || 
|-id=883 bgcolor=#E9E9E9
| 401883 ||  || — || August 24, 2001 || Anderson Mesa || LONEOS || — || align=right | 1.9 km || 
|-id=884 bgcolor=#E9E9E9
| 401884 ||  || — || August 19, 2001 || Socorro || LINEAR || — || align=right | 1.8 km || 
|-id=885 bgcolor=#FFC2E0
| 401885 ||  || — || September 11, 2001 || Anderson Mesa || LONEOS || ATE || align=right data-sort-value="0.28" | 280 m || 
|-id=886 bgcolor=#E9E9E9
| 401886 ||  || — || September 7, 2001 || Socorro || LINEAR || — || align=right | 1.9 km || 
|-id=887 bgcolor=#E9E9E9
| 401887 ||  || — || September 11, 2001 || Socorro || LINEAR || JUN || align=right data-sort-value="0.84" | 840 m || 
|-id=888 bgcolor=#E9E9E9
| 401888 ||  || — || September 24, 1960 || Palomar || PLS || — || align=right data-sort-value="0.85" | 850 m || 
|-id=889 bgcolor=#E9E9E9
| 401889 ||  || — || August 24, 2001 || Anderson Mesa || LONEOS || — || align=right | 1.8 km || 
|-id=890 bgcolor=#E9E9E9
| 401890 ||  || — || September 11, 2001 || Anderson Mesa || LONEOS || — || align=right | 1.3 km || 
|-id=891 bgcolor=#E9E9E9
| 401891 ||  || — || September 12, 2001 || Socorro || LINEAR || — || align=right | 1.7 km || 
|-id=892 bgcolor=#FA8072
| 401892 ||  || — || September 17, 2001 || Socorro || LINEAR || — || align=right | 2.6 km || 
|-id=893 bgcolor=#E9E9E9
| 401893 ||  || — || September 16, 2001 || Socorro || LINEAR || JUN || align=right | 1.0 km || 
|-id=894 bgcolor=#E9E9E9
| 401894 ||  || — || September 20, 2001 || Socorro || LINEAR || MAR || align=right | 1.3 km || 
|-id=895 bgcolor=#fefefe
| 401895 ||  || — || September 17, 2001 || Socorro || LINEAR || — || align=right data-sort-value="0.77" | 770 m || 
|-id=896 bgcolor=#fefefe
| 401896 ||  || — || September 19, 2001 || Socorro || LINEAR || H || align=right data-sort-value="0.71" | 710 m || 
|-id=897 bgcolor=#E9E9E9
| 401897 ||  || — || September 19, 2001 || Socorro || LINEAR || — || align=right | 1.7 km || 
|-id=898 bgcolor=#E9E9E9
| 401898 ||  || — || September 19, 2001 || Kitt Peak || Spacewatch || — || align=right | 1.5 km || 
|-id=899 bgcolor=#d6d6d6
| 401899 ||  || — || February 23, 1998 || Kitt Peak || Spacewatch || — || align=right | 3.5 km || 
|-id=900 bgcolor=#d6d6d6
| 401900 ||  || — || September 20, 2001 || Socorro || LINEAR || — || align=right | 2.7 km || 
|}

401901–402000 

|-bgcolor=#E9E9E9
| 401901 ||  || — || September 21, 2001 || Socorro || LINEAR || — || align=right | 1.5 km || 
|-id=902 bgcolor=#E9E9E9
| 401902 ||  || — || October 9, 2001 || Socorro || LINEAR || — || align=right | 3.1 km || 
|-id=903 bgcolor=#E9E9E9
| 401903 ||  || — || October 13, 2001 || Socorro || LINEAR || — || align=right | 2.0 km || 
|-id=904 bgcolor=#E9E9E9
| 401904 ||  || — || October 14, 2001 || Socorro || LINEAR || — || align=right | 1.7 km || 
|-id=905 bgcolor=#E9E9E9
| 401905 ||  || — || October 15, 2001 || Socorro || LINEAR || MRX || align=right | 1.4 km || 
|-id=906 bgcolor=#E9E9E9
| 401906 ||  || — || September 23, 2001 || Kitt Peak || Spacewatch || — || align=right | 1.6 km || 
|-id=907 bgcolor=#E9E9E9
| 401907 ||  || — || October 13, 2001 || Palomar || NEAT || JUN || align=right | 1.2 km || 
|-id=908 bgcolor=#E9E9E9
| 401908 ||  || — || October 11, 2001 || Palomar || NEAT || — || align=right | 1.8 km || 
|-id=909 bgcolor=#E9E9E9
| 401909 ||  || — || October 11, 2001 || Palomar || NEAT || — || align=right | 1.7 km || 
|-id=910 bgcolor=#fefefe
| 401910 ||  || — || October 17, 2001 || Kitt Peak || Spacewatch || — || align=right data-sort-value="0.77" | 770 m || 
|-id=911 bgcolor=#E9E9E9
| 401911 ||  || — || October 17, 2001 || Socorro || LINEAR || — || align=right | 2.0 km || 
|-id=912 bgcolor=#fefefe
| 401912 ||  || — || October 20, 2001 || Socorro || LINEAR || — || align=right data-sort-value="0.53" | 530 m || 
|-id=913 bgcolor=#fefefe
| 401913 ||  || — || October 22, 2001 || Socorro || LINEAR || — || align=right data-sort-value="0.69" | 690 m || 
|-id=914 bgcolor=#E9E9E9
| 401914 ||  || — || October 20, 2001 || Socorro || LINEAR || — || align=right | 1.4 km || 
|-id=915 bgcolor=#fefefe
| 401915 ||  || — || September 16, 2001 || Socorro || LINEAR || — || align=right data-sort-value="0.67" | 670 m || 
|-id=916 bgcolor=#fefefe
| 401916 ||  || — || November 9, 2001 || Socorro || LINEAR || — || align=right data-sort-value="0.86" | 860 m || 
|-id=917 bgcolor=#fefefe
| 401917 ||  || — || November 11, 2001 || Apache Point || SDSS || — || align=right data-sort-value="0.78" | 780 m || 
|-id=918 bgcolor=#E9E9E9
| 401918 ||  || — || November 17, 2001 || Socorro || LINEAR || — || align=right | 2.9 km || 
|-id=919 bgcolor=#E9E9E9
| 401919 ||  || — || October 24, 2001 || Kitt Peak || Spacewatch || — || align=right | 1.8 km || 
|-id=920 bgcolor=#E9E9E9
| 401920 ||  || — || November 19, 2001 || Socorro || LINEAR || — || align=right | 2.5 km || 
|-id=921 bgcolor=#FA8072
| 401921 ||  || — || December 9, 2001 || Socorro || LINEAR || — || align=right | 3.7 km || 
|-id=922 bgcolor=#E9E9E9
| 401922 ||  || — || December 9, 2001 || Socorro || LINEAR || — || align=right | 1.7 km || 
|-id=923 bgcolor=#fefefe
| 401923 ||  || — || December 14, 2001 || Socorro || LINEAR || — || align=right data-sort-value="0.83" | 830 m || 
|-id=924 bgcolor=#E9E9E9
| 401924 ||  || — || November 24, 2001 || Socorro || LINEAR || — || align=right | 2.3 km || 
|-id=925 bgcolor=#FFC2E0
| 401925 ||  || — || January 12, 2002 || Socorro || LINEAR || APO || align=right data-sort-value="0.48" | 480 m || 
|-id=926 bgcolor=#E9E9E9
| 401926 ||  || — || January 13, 2002 || Socorro || LINEAR || — || align=right | 3.0 km || 
|-id=927 bgcolor=#fefefe
| 401927 ||  || — || January 14, 2002 || Socorro || LINEAR || — || align=right data-sort-value="0.94" | 940 m || 
|-id=928 bgcolor=#fefefe
| 401928 ||  || — || February 6, 2002 || Socorro || LINEAR || H || align=right data-sort-value="0.91" | 910 m || 
|-id=929 bgcolor=#E9E9E9
| 401929 ||  || — || February 7, 2002 || Socorro || LINEAR || — || align=right | 2.0 km || 
|-id=930 bgcolor=#d6d6d6
| 401930 ||  || — || February 10, 2002 || Socorro || LINEAR || KOR || align=right | 1.7 km || 
|-id=931 bgcolor=#fefefe
| 401931 ||  || — || February 7, 2002 || Socorro || LINEAR || — || align=right data-sort-value="0.86" | 860 m || 
|-id=932 bgcolor=#fefefe
| 401932 ||  || — || February 10, 2002 || Socorro || LINEAR || V || align=right data-sort-value="0.71" | 710 m || 
|-id=933 bgcolor=#fefefe
| 401933 ||  || — || February 10, 2002 || Socorro || LINEAR || — || align=right data-sort-value="0.73" | 730 m || 
|-id=934 bgcolor=#fefefe
| 401934 ||  || — || February 10, 2002 || Socorro || LINEAR || — || align=right data-sort-value="0.74" | 740 m || 
|-id=935 bgcolor=#fefefe
| 401935 ||  || — || February 10, 2002 || Socorro || LINEAR || MAS || align=right data-sort-value="0.82" | 820 m || 
|-id=936 bgcolor=#E9E9E9
| 401936 ||  || — || February 7, 2002 || Palomar || NEAT || — || align=right | 2.4 km || 
|-id=937 bgcolor=#fefefe
| 401937 ||  || — || February 6, 2002 || Kitt Peak || M. W. Buie || — || align=right data-sort-value="0.81" | 810 m || 
|-id=938 bgcolor=#d6d6d6
| 401938 ||  || — || March 12, 2002 || Palomar || NEAT || — || align=right | 2.6 km || 
|-id=939 bgcolor=#d6d6d6
| 401939 ||  || — || March 12, 2002 || Kitt Peak || Spacewatch || EOS || align=right | 1.8 km || 
|-id=940 bgcolor=#d6d6d6
| 401940 ||  || — || March 10, 2002 || Kitt Peak || Spacewatch || — || align=right | 2.9 km || 
|-id=941 bgcolor=#fefefe
| 401941 ||  || — || March 14, 2002 || Socorro || LINEAR || (2076) || align=right | 1.2 km || 
|-id=942 bgcolor=#fefefe
| 401942 ||  || — || March 12, 2002 || Palomar || NEAT || — || align=right data-sort-value="0.78" | 780 m || 
|-id=943 bgcolor=#fefefe
| 401943 ||  || — || March 12, 2002 || Kitt Peak || Spacewatch || — || align=right data-sort-value="0.83" | 830 m || 
|-id=944 bgcolor=#fefefe
| 401944 ||  || — || April 12, 2002 || Palomar || NEAT || (5026) || align=right | 2.3 km || 
|-id=945 bgcolor=#fefefe
| 401945 ||  || — || May 4, 2002 || Anderson Mesa || LONEOS || — || align=right | 2.0 km || 
|-id=946 bgcolor=#fefefe
| 401946 ||  || — || May 7, 2002 || Palomar || NEAT || — || align=right data-sort-value="0.83" | 830 m || 
|-id=947 bgcolor=#d6d6d6
| 401947 ||  || — || August 3, 2002 || Palomar || NEAT || THB || align=right | 3.5 km || 
|-id=948 bgcolor=#fefefe
| 401948 ||  || — || August 5, 2002 || Campo Imperatore || CINEOS || — || align=right data-sort-value="0.79" | 790 m || 
|-id=949 bgcolor=#d6d6d6
| 401949 ||  || — || August 28, 2002 || Palomar || NEAT || — || align=right | 2.5 km || 
|-id=950 bgcolor=#E9E9E9
| 401950 ||  || — || August 30, 2002 || Palomar || NEAT || — || align=right data-sort-value="0.79" | 790 m || 
|-id=951 bgcolor=#E9E9E9
| 401951 ||  || — || August 16, 2002 || Palomar || NEAT || — || align=right | 1.8 km || 
|-id=952 bgcolor=#E9E9E9
| 401952 ||  || — || August 29, 2002 || Palomar || NEAT || — || align=right data-sort-value="0.94" | 940 m || 
|-id=953 bgcolor=#E9E9E9
| 401953 ||  || — || September 3, 2002 || Haleakala || NEAT || MAR || align=right | 1.4 km || 
|-id=954 bgcolor=#FFC2E0
| 401954 ||  || — || September 5, 2002 || Socorro || LINEAR || ATEPHA || align=right data-sort-value="0.62" | 620 m || 
|-id=955 bgcolor=#E9E9E9
| 401955 ||  || — || September 2, 2002 || Haleakala || NEAT || (5) || align=right | 1.1 km || 
|-id=956 bgcolor=#E9E9E9
| 401956 ||  || — || September 3, 2002 || Haleakala || NEAT || (5) || align=right data-sort-value="0.85" | 850 m || 
|-id=957 bgcolor=#E9E9E9
| 401957 ||  || — || September 14, 2002 || Palomar || R. Matson || — || align=right data-sort-value="0.98" | 980 m || 
|-id=958 bgcolor=#d6d6d6
| 401958 ||  || — || September 14, 2002 || Palomar || NEAT || 7:4 || align=right | 3.2 km || 
|-id=959 bgcolor=#E9E9E9
| 401959 ||  || — || September 4, 2002 || Palomar || NEAT || — || align=right data-sort-value="0.86" | 860 m || 
|-id=960 bgcolor=#E9E9E9
| 401960 ||  || — || September 11, 2002 || Palomar || NEAT || (5) || align=right data-sort-value="0.98" | 980 m || 
|-id=961 bgcolor=#d6d6d6
| 401961 ||  || — || September 14, 2002 || Palomar || NEAT || — || align=right | 3.9 km || 
|-id=962 bgcolor=#E9E9E9
| 401962 ||  || — || September 26, 2002 || Palomar || NEAT || — || align=right data-sort-value="0.85" | 850 m || 
|-id=963 bgcolor=#E9E9E9
| 401963 ||  || — || September 26, 2002 || Palomar || NEAT || — || align=right | 1.0 km || 
|-id=964 bgcolor=#E9E9E9
| 401964 ||  || — || September 30, 2002 || Haleakala || NEAT || — || align=right | 1.2 km || 
|-id=965 bgcolor=#E9E9E9
| 401965 ||  || — || October 4, 2002 || Palomar || NEAT || — || align=right data-sort-value="0.85" | 850 m || 
|-id=966 bgcolor=#E9E9E9
| 401966 ||  || — || October 4, 2002 || Socorro || LINEAR || (5) || align=right data-sort-value="0.95" | 950 m || 
|-id=967 bgcolor=#E9E9E9
| 401967 ||  || — || October 4, 2002 || Socorro || LINEAR || (5) || align=right data-sort-value="0.96" | 960 m || 
|-id=968 bgcolor=#FA8072
| 401968 ||  || — || October 4, 2002 || Anderson Mesa || LONEOS || — || align=right data-sort-value="0.54" | 540 m || 
|-id=969 bgcolor=#E9E9E9
| 401969 ||  || — || October 2, 2002 || Haleakala || NEAT || — || align=right data-sort-value="0.86" | 860 m || 
|-id=970 bgcolor=#E9E9E9
| 401970 ||  || — || October 4, 2002 || Socorro || LINEAR || — || align=right | 1.0 km || 
|-id=971 bgcolor=#E9E9E9
| 401971 ||  || — || October 3, 2002 || Socorro || LINEAR || — || align=right | 1.0 km || 
|-id=972 bgcolor=#E9E9E9
| 401972 ||  || — || October 6, 2002 || Socorro || LINEAR || — || align=right | 4.7 km || 
|-id=973 bgcolor=#E9E9E9
| 401973 ||  || — || October 7, 2002 || Socorro || LINEAR || — || align=right | 1.7 km || 
|-id=974 bgcolor=#E9E9E9
| 401974 ||  || — || October 9, 2002 || Socorro || LINEAR || — || align=right data-sort-value="0.85" | 850 m || 
|-id=975 bgcolor=#E9E9E9
| 401975 ||  || — || October 9, 2002 || Socorro || LINEAR || — || align=right data-sort-value="0.78" | 780 m || 
|-id=976 bgcolor=#E9E9E9
| 401976 ||  || — || October 5, 2002 || Apache Point || SDSS || (5) || align=right data-sort-value="0.89" | 890 m || 
|-id=977 bgcolor=#E9E9E9
| 401977 ||  || — || October 9, 2002 || Palomar || NEAT || (5) || align=right data-sort-value="0.85" | 850 m || 
|-id=978 bgcolor=#E9E9E9
| 401978 ||  || — || October 30, 2002 || Palomar || NEAT || — || align=right data-sort-value="0.98" | 980 m || 
|-id=979 bgcolor=#FA8072
| 401979 ||  || — || October 30, 2002 || Haleakala || NEAT || — || align=right data-sort-value="0.54" | 540 m || 
|-id=980 bgcolor=#E9E9E9
| 401980 ||  || — || November 4, 2002 || Palomar || NEAT || (5) || align=right data-sort-value="0.62" | 620 m || 
|-id=981 bgcolor=#E9E9E9
| 401981 ||  || — || November 4, 2002 || Palomar || NEAT || — || align=right | 1.4 km || 
|-id=982 bgcolor=#E9E9E9
| 401982 ||  || — || November 5, 2002 || Socorro || LINEAR || — || align=right data-sort-value="0.83" | 830 m || 
|-id=983 bgcolor=#E9E9E9
| 401983 ||  || — || November 7, 2002 || Socorro || LINEAR || — || align=right | 1.4 km || 
|-id=984 bgcolor=#E9E9E9
| 401984 ||  || — || November 11, 2002 || Socorro || LINEAR || — || align=right | 1.4 km || 
|-id=985 bgcolor=#fefefe
| 401985 ||  || — || November 12, 2002 || Socorro || LINEAR || H || align=right data-sort-value="0.75" | 750 m || 
|-id=986 bgcolor=#E9E9E9
| 401986 ||  || — || November 5, 2002 || Palomar || NEAT || (5) || align=right data-sort-value="0.86" | 860 m || 
|-id=987 bgcolor=#fefefe
| 401987 ||  || — || November 12, 2002 || Socorro || LINEAR || H || align=right data-sort-value="0.77" | 770 m || 
|-id=988 bgcolor=#fefefe
| 401988 ||  || — || November 16, 2002 || Palomar || NEAT || — || align=right data-sort-value="0.71" | 710 m || 
|-id=989 bgcolor=#E9E9E9
| 401989 ||  || — || November 28, 2002 || Haleakala || NEAT || (5) || align=right data-sort-value="0.83" | 830 m || 
|-id=990 bgcolor=#E9E9E9
| 401990 ||  || — || December 10, 2002 || Socorro || LINEAR || — || align=right | 1.1 km || 
|-id=991 bgcolor=#E9E9E9
| 401991 ||  || — || December 31, 2002 || Socorro || LINEAR || — || align=right | 2.7 km || 
|-id=992 bgcolor=#E9E9E9
| 401992 ||  || — || January 1, 2003 || Socorro || LINEAR || — || align=right | 1.1 km || 
|-id=993 bgcolor=#E9E9E9
| 401993 ||  || — || January 10, 2003 || Palomar || NEAT || — || align=right | 1.5 km || 
|-id=994 bgcolor=#FA8072
| 401994 ||  || — || January 26, 2003 || Anderson Mesa || LONEOS || — || align=right | 1.8 km || 
|-id=995 bgcolor=#E9E9E9
| 401995 ||  || — || January 27, 2003 || Socorro || LINEAR || JUN || align=right | 1.2 km || 
|-id=996 bgcolor=#d6d6d6
| 401996 ||  || — || March 30, 2003 || Anderson Mesa || LONEOS || — || align=right | 2.9 km || 
|-id=997 bgcolor=#fefefe
| 401997 ||  || — || April 2, 2003 || Haleakala || NEAT || — || align=right data-sort-value="0.96" | 960 m || 
|-id=998 bgcolor=#FFC2E0
| 401998 ||  || — || June 22, 2003 || Socorro || LINEAR || APOcritical || align=right data-sort-value="0.74" | 740 m || 
|-id=999 bgcolor=#fefefe
| 401999 ||  || — || July 1, 2003 || Haleakala || NEAT || — || align=right data-sort-value="0.89" | 890 m || 
|-id=000 bgcolor=#d6d6d6
| 402000 ||  || — || July 29, 2003 || Mauna Kea || E.-M. David || — || align=right | 2.4 km || 
|}

References

External links 
 Discovery Circumstances: Numbered Minor Planets (400001)–(405000) (IAU Minor Planet Center)

0401